This is a list of church cantatas by Christoph Graupner (1683–1760), the German harpsichordist and composer of high Baroque music.

The format is to list by GWV number, followed by title, year, scoring and religious feast day or holiday the cantata was composed for. Graupner wrote a large number of church cantatas, more than 1,400.

Church cantatas by GWV number

GWV 1101

 GWV 1101/12:  (1712) - SATB, ob (2), str, bc - 1st Sunday in Advent
 GWV 1101/14:  (1714) - SSATB, ob (2), hn (2), str, bc - 1st Sunday in Advent
 GWV 1101/17:  (1717) - SSATB, ob (2), str, bc - 1st Sunday in Advent
 GWV 1101/19:  (1719) - SSATB, str, bc - 1st Sunday in Advent
 GWV 1101/20:  (1720) - SSTB, fl (2), str, bc - 1st Sunday in Advent
 GWV 1101/22:  (1722) - SSTB, ob (2), fg, hn, str, bc - 1st Sunday in Advent
 GWV 1101/24:  (1724) - SATB, str, bc - 1st Sunday in Advent
 GWV 1101/27:  (1727) - SAT(B), fl/ob, str, bc - 1st Sunday in Advent
 GWV 1101/29:  (1729) - SATB, str, bc - 1st Sunday in Advent
 GWV 1101/30:  (1730) - SATB, ob am, str, bc - 1st Sunday in Advent
 GWV 1101/31:  (1731) - SATB, clar (2), timp (2), str, bc - 1st Sunday in Advent
 GWV 1101/33:  (1733) - SATB, (fl), hn, tra, str, bc - 1st Sunday in Advent
 GWV 1101/36:  (1736) - SATB, ob (2), str, bc - 1st Sunday in Advent
 GWV 1101/37:  (1737) - SATB, ob (2), chal(2)ab, str, bc - 1st Sunday in Advent
 GWV 1101/39:  (1739) - SATB, (ob), str, bc - 1st Sunday in Advent
 GWV 1101/40:  (1740) - SATB, ob (2), fg, vla, str, bc - 1st Sunday in Advent
 GWV 1101/41:  (1741) - SATB, ob (2), str, bc - 1st Sunday in Advent
 GWV 1101/42:  (1742) - SATB, str, bc - 1st Sunday in Advent
 GWV 1101/43:  (1743) - SATB, hn (2), timp (4), str, bc - 1st Sunday in Advent
 GWV 1101/44:  (1744) - SATB, ob (2), hn (2), timp (4), str, bc - 1st Sunday in Advent
 GWV 1101/46:  (1746) - SATB, ob (2), hn (2), timp (4), str, bc - 1st Sunday in Advent
 GWV 1101/47:  (1747) - SATB, chal(2)ab, fg, hn (2), clar (2), timp (4), str, bc - 1st Sunday in Advent
 GWV 1101/49:  (1749) - SATB, str, bc - 1st Sunday in Advent
 GWV 1101/53:  (1753) - SSATB, ob (2), fg, clar (2), timp (4), str, bc - 1st Sunday in Advent

GWV 1102

 GWV 1102/11a:  (1711) - SATB, ob (2), str, bc - 2nd Sunday in Advent
 GWV 1102/11b:  (1711) - S, str, bc - 2nd Sunday in Advent
 GWV 1102/13:  (1713) - SATB, ob (2), vl, str, bc - 2nd Sunday in Advent
 GWV 1102/21:  (1721) - SSATB, rec (2), ob (2), fg, hn (2), str, bc - 2nd Sunday in Advent
 GWV 1102/23:  (1723) - SATB, str, bc - 2nd Sunday in Advent
 GWV 1102/25:  (1725) - SATB, fl (2), ob (2), hn (2), str, bc - 2nd Sunday in Advent
 GWV 1102/26:  (1726) - SATB, fl (2), str, bc - 2nd Sunday in Advent
 GWV 1102/27:  (1727) - SAT, fl (2), str, bc - 2nd Sunday in Advent
 GWV 1102/28:  (1728) - SATB, str, bc - 2nd Sunday in Advent
 GWV 1102/32:  (1732) - SATB, str, bc - 2nd Sunday in Advent
 GWV 1102/34:  (1734) - SATB, ob (2), str, bc - 2nd Sunday in Advent
 GWV 1102/35:  (1735) - SATB, chal(2)tb, str, bc - 2nd Sunday in Advent
 GWV 1102/38:  (1738) - SATB, str, bc - 2nd Sunday in Advent
 GWV 1102/39:  (1739) - SATB, ob (2), chal(3)sab, str, bc - 2nd Sunday in Advent
 GWV 1102/40:  (1740) - SATB, fg, str, bc - 2nd Sunday in Advent
 GWV 1102/41:  (1741) - SATB, str, bc - 2nd Sunday in Advent
 GWV 1102/42:  (1742) - SATB, str, bc - 2nd Sunday in Advent
 GWV 1102/43:  (1743) - SATB, str, bc - 2nd Sunday in Advent
 GWV 1102/45:  (1745) - SATB, str, bc - 2nd Sunday in Advent
 GWV 1102/48:  (1748) - SATB, hn (2), str, bc - 2nd Sunday in Advent
 GWV 1102/50:  (1750) - SATB, fl (2), str, bc - 2nd Sunday in Advent
 GWV 1102/52:  (1752) - SATB, str, bc - 2nd Sunday in Advent

GWV 1103

 GWV 1103/14:  (1714) - SSATB, ob, str, bc - 3rd Sunday in Advent
 GWV 1103/17:  (1717) - B, ob, fg, str, bc - 3rd Sunday in Advent
 GWV 1103/19:  (1719) - S, vl unis, bc - 3rd Sunday in Advent
 GWV 1103/20:  (1720) - SSTB, str, bc - 3rd Sunday in Advent
 GWV 1103/22:  (1722) - SSTB, str, bc - 3rd Sunday in Advent
 GWV 1103/27:  (1727) - SAT, str, bc - 3rd Sunday in Advent
 GWV 1103/29:  (1729) - SATB, str, bc - 3rd Sunday in Advent
 GWV 1103/31:  (1731) - SATB, str, bc - 3rd Sunday in Advent
 GWV 1103/33:  (1733) - SATB, str, bc - 3rd Sunday in Advent
 GWV 1103/37:  (1737) - SATB, ob (2), str, bc - 3rd Sunday in Advent
 GWV 1103/39:  (1739) - SATB, ob (2), chals, fg, str, bc - 3rd Sunday in Advent
 GWV 1103/40:  (1740) - SATB, ob (2), str, bc - 3rd Sunday in Advent
 GWV 1103/41:  (1741) - SATB, str, bc - 3rd Sunday in Advent
 GWV 1103/42:  (1742) - SATB, str, bc - 3rd Sunday in Advent
 GWV 1103/43:  (1743) - SATB, str, bc - 3rd Sunday in Advent
 GWV 1103/45:  (1745) - SATB, str, bc - 3rd Sunday in Advent
 GWV 1103/46:  (1746) - SATB, str, bc - 3rd Sunday in Advent
 GWV 1103/47:  (1747) - SATB, str, bc - 3rd Sunday in Advent
 GWV 1103/49:  (1749) - SATB, str, bc - 3rd Sunday in Advent
 GWV 1103/52:  (1752) - SATB, hn (2), str, bc - 3rd Sunday in Advent

GWV 1104

 GWV 1104/09:  (1709) - SATB, str, bc - 4th Sunday in Advent
 GWV 1104/11a:  (1711) - SSATB, str, bc - 4th Sunday in Advent
 GWV 1104/11b:  (1711) - SSATB, ob, (tra), str, bc - 4th Sunday in Advent
 GWV 1104/11c:  (1711) - B, ob, str, bc - 4th Sunday in Advent
 GWV 1104/21:  (1721) - SSATB, str, bc - 4th Sunday in Advent
 GWV 1104/23:  (1723) - SATB, org, str, bc - 4th Sunday in Advent
 GWV 1104/27:  (1727) - SAT, str, bc - 4th Sunday in Advent
 GWV 1104/28:  (1728) - SATB, str, bc - 4th Sunday in Advent
 GWV 1104/32:  (1732) - ATB, str, bc - 4th Sunday in Advent
 GWV 1104/34:  (1734) - SATB, str, bc - 4th Sunday in Advent
 GWV 1104/35:  (1735) - SATB, str, bc - 4th Sunday in Advent
 GWV 1104/36:  (1736) - SATB, chal(2)tb, str, bc - 4th Sunday in Advent
 GWV 1104/38:  (1738) - SATB, str, bc - 4th Sunday in Advent
 GWV 1104/39:  (1739) - SATB, ob (2), clar, vl, str, bc - 4th Sunday in Advent
 GWV 1104/40:  (1740) - SATB, (ob), str, bc - 4th Sunday in Advent
 GWV 1104/41:  (1741) - SATB, str, bc - 4th Sunday in Advent
 GWV 1104/42:  (1742) - SATB, str, bc - 4th Sunday in Advent
 GWV 1104/48:  (1748) - SATB, str, bc - 4th Sunday in Advent
 GWV 1104/50:  (1750) - SATB, str, bc - 4th Sunday in Advent
 GWV 1104/52:  (1752) - ATB, str, bc - 4th Sunday in Advent

GWV 1105

 GWV 1105/12:  (1712) - SSATB, ob (2), clar (2), trb (3), timp (2), str, bc - Christmas Day
 GWV 1105/27:  (1727) - SATTB, fl (2), ob (3), fg, clar (2), timp (2), str, bc - Christmas Day
 GWV 1105/39:  (1739) - SATB, ob (2), clar (2), timp (2), vl, str, bc - Christmas Day
 GWV 1105/40:  (1740) - SATB, ob (2), clar (2), timp (2), str, bc - Christmas Day
 GWV 1105/41:  (1741) - SATB, ob (2), clar (2), timp (2), str, bc - Christmas Day
 GWV 1105/42:  (1742) - SATB, hn (2), timp (4), str, bc - Christmas Day
 GWV 1105/43:  (1743) - SATB, fg, hn (2), timp (4), str, bc - Christmas Day
 GWV 1105/44:  (1744) - SATB, str, bc - Christmas Day
 GWV 1105/45:  (1745) - SATB, str, bc - Christmas Day
 GWV 1105/46:  (1746) - SATB, hn (2), clar, timp (4), str, bc - Christmas Day
 GWV 1105/47:  (1747) - SATB, fl (2), fg, hn (2), clar (2), timp (4), str, bc - Christmas Day
 GWV 1105/48:  (1748) - SATB, chal(2)tb, hn (2), timp (4), str, bc - Christmas Day
 GWV 1105/49:  (1749) - SATB, fl (2), ob (2), fg (2), hn (2), timp (4), str, bc - Christmas Day
 GWV 1105/50:  (1750) - SATB, fl (2), hn (2), clar, timp (2), str, bc - Christmas Day
 GWV 1105/52:  (1752) - SATB, clar (2), hn (2), timp (2), str, bc - Christmas Day
 GWV 1105/53:  (1753) - SATB, fl (2), ob (2), hn (2), timp (4), vl, str, bc - Christmas Day

GWV 1106

 GWV 1106/19:  (1719) - S, str, bc - 2nd Day of Christmas (St. Stefanus Day)
 GWV 1106/39:  (1739) - SATB, chal (3)stb, str, bc - 2nd Day of Christmas (St. Stefanus Day)
 GWV 1106/40:  (1740) - SATB, ob (2), str, bc - 2nd Day of Christmas (St. Stefanus Day)
 GWV 1106/41:  (1741) - SATB, ob (2), str, bc - 2nd Day of Christmas (St. Stefanus Day)
 GWV 1106/42:  (1742) - SATB, str, bc - 2nd Day of Christmas (St. Stefanus Day)
 GWV 1106/44:  (1744) - SATB, str, bc - 2nd Day of Christmas (St. Stefanus Day)
 GWV 1106/45:  (1745) - SATB, str, bc - 2nd Day of Christmas (St. Stefanus Day)
 GWV 1106/46:  (1746) - SATB, str, bc - 2nd Day of Christmas (St. Stefanus Day)
 GWV 1106/47:  (1747) - SATB, hn (2), str, bc - 2nd Day of Christmas (St. Stefanus Day)
 GWV 1106/48:  (1748) - SATB, (fl (2)), fg (2), hn (2), str, bc - 2nd Day of Christmas (St. Stefanus Day)
 GWV 1106/49:  (1749) - SATB, str, bc - 2nd Day of Christmas (St. Stefanus Day)
 GWV 1106/50:  (1750) - SATB, str, bc - 2nd Day of Christmas (St. Stefanus Day)

GWV 1107

 GWV 1107/12:  (1712) - SB, ob (2), hn (2), vl (2), bc - 3rd Day of Christmas (St John's Day)
 GWV 1107/27:  (1727) - SAT, fl, fg, str, bc - 3rd Day of Christmas (St John's Day)
 GWV 1107/39:  (1739) - SATB, (fl), str, bc - 3rd Day of Christmas (St John's Day)
 GWV 1107/40:  (1740) - SATB, (ob), str, bc - 3rd Day of Christmas (St John's Day)
 GWV 1107/41:  (1741) - B, str, bc - 3rd Day of Christmas (St John's Day)
 GWV 1107/43:  (1743) - SATB, str, bc - 3rd Day of Christmas (St John's Day)
 GWV 1107/44:  (1744) - S, clar, vl, str, bc - 3rd Day of Christmas (St John's Day)
 GWV 1107/45:  (1745) - T, str, bc - 3rd Day of Christmas (St John's Day)
 GWV 1107/46:  (1746) - SATB, str, bc - 3rd Day of Christmas (St John's Day)
 GWV 1107/47:  (1747) - T, str, bc - 3rd Day of Christmas (St John's Day)
 GWV 1107/48:  (1748) - SATB, chal (2)ab, hn (2), str, bc - 3rd Day of Christmas (St John's Day)
 GWV 1107/49:  (1749) - ATB, str, bc - 3rd Day of Christmas (St John's Day)
 GWV 1107/50:  (1750) - B, vl unis, vla, bc - 3rd Day of Christmas (St John's Day)
 GWV 1107/51:  (1751) - SATB, (fl (2)), str, bc - 3rd Day of Christmas (St John's Day)

GWV 1108

 GWV 1108/19:  (1719) - B, vl unis, bc - 1st Sunday after Christmas Day
 GWV 1108/20:  (1720) - SSTB, str, bc - 1st Sunday after Christmas Day
 GWV 1108/21:  (1721) - SSATB, str, bc - 1st Sunday after Christmas Day
 GWV 1108/25:  (1725) - SATB, str, bc - 1st Sunday after Christmas Day
 GWV 1108/27:  (1727) - SAT, str, bc - 1st Sunday after Christmas Day
 GWV 1108/30:  (1730) - ATB, str, bc - 1st Sunday after Christmas Day
 GWV 1108/31:  (1731) - SATB, str, bc - 1st Sunday after Christmas Day
 GWV 1108/37:  (1737) - SATB, str, bc - 1st Sunday after Christmas Day
 GWV 1108/41:  (1741) - SATB, ob, str, bc - 1st Sunday after Christmas Day
 GWV 1108/42:  (1742) - SATB, str, bc - 1st Sunday after Christmas Day
 GWV 1108/45:  (1745) - B, str, bc - 1st Sunday after Christmas Day
 GWV 1108/49:  (1749) - SATB, str, bc - 1st Sunday after Christmas Day

GWV 1109

 GWV 1109/14:  (1714) - SATB, str, bc - New Year's Day
 GWV 1109/16:  (1716) - SSATB, str, bc - New Year's Day
 GWV 1109/18:  (1718) - SATB, (fg (2)), str, bc - New Year's Day
 GWV 1109/24:  (1724) - SATB, clar (2), timp (2), str, bc - New Year's Day
 GWV 1109/25:  (1725) - SSATB, ob, clar (2), timp (2), str, bc - New Year's Day
 GWV 1109/28:  (1728) - SAT, (fl), ob (2), hn (2), clar (2), timp (2), str, bc - New Year's Day
 GWV 1109/29:  (1729) - SATB, ob (2), fg, clar (2), timp (2), str, bc - New Year's Day
 GWV 1109/30:  (1730) - SATB, fl am, ob am, clar (2), timp (2), str, bc - New Year's Day
 GWV 1109/34:  (1734) - SATB, fl (2), clar (2), timp (2), str, bc - New Year's Day
 GWV 1109/35:  (1735) - SSATB, fl (2), ob (2), hn (2), timp (2), str, bc - New Year's Day
 GWV 1109/36:  (1736) - SSATB, ob (2), hn (2), timp (2), str, bc - New Year's Day
 GWV 1109/37:  (1737) - SATB, chal (2)tb, fg, (timp (4)), str, bc - New Year's Day
 GWV 1109/39:  (1739) - SAATTBB, ob (2), fg, str, bc - New Year's Day
 GWV 1109/40:  (1740) - SATB, ob (2), clar (2), timp (2), vla am, str, bc - New Year's Day
 GWV 1109/41:  (1741) - SATB, (fl), ob (2), clar (2), timp (4), str, bc - New Year's Day
 GWV 1109/42:  (1742) - SATB, fl, ob (2), clar (2), timp (2), str, bc - New Year's Day
 GWV 1109/43:  (1743) - SATB, hn (2), timp (4), str, bc - New Year's Day
 GWV 1109/45:  (1745) - SATB, ob (2), hn (2), timp (4), str, bc - New Year's Day
 GWV 1109/50:  (1750) - SATB, str, bc - New Year's Day
 GWV 1109/51:  (1751) - SATB, hn (2), clar (2), timp (4), str, bc - New Year's Day
 GWV 1109/53:  (1753) - SATB, hn (2), clar (2), timp (5), str, bc - New Year's Day

GWV 1110

 GWV 1110/21:  (1721) - SSTB, str, bc - Sunday after New Year
 GWV 1110/22:  (1722) - STB, str, bc - Sunday after New Year
 GWV 1110/27:  (1727) - SATB, fl (2), ob (2), str, bc - Sunday after New Year
 GWV 1110/28:  (1728) - SAT, fg, str, bc - Sunday after New Year
 GWV 1110/32:  (1732) - SATB, str, bc - Sunday after New Year
 GWV 1110/33:  (1733) - ATB, str, bc - Sunday after New Year
 GWV 1110/38:  (1738) - SATBB, str, bc - Sunday after New Year
 GWV 1110/40:  (1740) - SATB, str, bc - Sunday after New Year
 GWV 1110/44:  (1744) - SATB, str, bc - Sunday after New Year
 GWV 1110/49:  (1749) - SATB, chal (2)ab, hn (2), str, bc - Sunday after New Year

GWV 1111

 GWV 1111/10:  (1710) - S, str, bc - Feast of Epiphany / (Kings of the East)
 GWV 1111/13:  (1713) - B, ob (2), str, bc - Feast of Epiphany / (Kings of the East)
 GWV 1111/16:  (1716) - SATB, str, bc - Feast of Epiphany / (Kings of the East)
 GWV 1111/18:  (1718) - SATB, fl, ob (am), clar (2), timp (2), str, bc - Feast of Epiphany / (Kings of the East)
 GWV 1111/20:  (1720) - SSTB, str, bc - Feast of Epiphany / (Kings of the East)
 GWV 1111/24:  (1724) - SATB, str, bc - Feast of Epiphany / (Kings of the East)
 GWV 1111/26:  (1726) - SATB, ob (2), fg, clar (2), timp (2), str, bc - Feast of Epiphany / (Kings of the East)
 GWV 1111/28:  (1728) - SAT, fl, ob, str, bc - Feast of Epiphany / (Kings of the East)
 GWV 1111/29:  (1729) - SATB, fl, ob, str, bc - Feast of Epiphany / (Kings of the East)
 GWV 1111/31:  (1731) - SATB, clar (2), timp (2), str, bc - Feast of Epiphany / (Kings of the East)
 GWV 1111/34:  (1734) - SATB, vla am, str, bc - Feast of Epiphany / (Kings of the East)
 GWV 1111/35:  (1735) - SATB, str, bc - Feast of Epiphany / (Kings of the East)
 GWV 1111/37:  (1737) - SATB, fl, chalb, fg, str, bc - Feast of Epiphany / (Kings of the East)
 GWV 1111/39:  (1739) - SATB, chals (fl, ob?), str, bc - Feast of Epiphany / (Kings of the East)
 GWV 1111/40:  (1740) - SATB, ob, str, bc - Feast of Epiphany / (Kings of the East)
 GWV 1111/41:  (1741) - SATB, chal (3)stb, str, bc - Feast of Epiphany / (Kings of the East)
 GWV 1111/42:  (1742) - TB, str, bc - Feast of Epiphany / (Kings of the East)
 GWV 1111/43:  (1743) - SATB, str, bc - Feast of Epiphany / (Kings of the East)
 GWV 1111/44:  (1744) - SATB, chal (2)tb, fg, timp (4), str, bc - Feast of Epiphany / (Kings of the East)
 GWV 1111/47:  (1747) - SATB, str, bc - Feast of Epiphany / (Kings of the East)
 GWV 1111/50:  (1750) - SATB, fl (2), hn (2), str, bc - Feast of Epiphany / (Kings of the East)

GWV 1112

 GWV 1112/14:  (1714) - TB, str, bc - 1st Sunday after Epiphany
 GWV 1112/21:  (1721) - SATB, str, bc - 1st Sunday after Epiphany
 GWV 1112/22:  (1722) - SATB, str, bc - 1st Sunday after Epiphany
 GWV 1112/25:  (1725) - SATB, ob, str, bc - 1st Sunday after Epiphany
 GWV 1112/27:  (1727) - SATB, ob (2), fg, str, bc - 1st Sunday after Epiphany
 GWV 1112/28:  (1728) - SAT, str, bc - 1st Sunday after Epiphany
 GWV 1112/30:  (1730) - SATB, str, bc - 1st Sunday after Epiphany
 GWV 1112/33:  (1733) - SATB, str, bc - 1st Sunday after Epiphany
 GWV 1112/36:  (1736) - SATB, str, bc - 1st Sunday after Epiphany
 GWV 1112/38:  (1738) - SATB, str, bc - 1st Sunday after Epiphany
 GWV 1112/40:  (1740) - SATB, chal (3)stb, str, bc - 1st Sunday after Epiphany
 GWV 1112/41:  (1741) - SATB, str, bc - 1st Sunday after Epiphany
 GWV 1112/42:  (1742) - ATB, str, bc - 1st Sunday after Epiphany
 GWV 1112/43:  (1743) - ATB, str, bc - 1st Sunday after Epiphany
 GWV 1112/44:  (1744) - SATB, ob, str, bc - 1st Sunday after Epiphany
 GWV 1112/46:  (1746) - SATB, str, bc - 1st Sunday after Epiphany
 GWV 1112/48:  (1748) - ATB, str, bc - 1st Sunday after Epiphany
 GWV 1112/49:  (1749) - SATB, fl (2), hn (2), str, bc - 1st Sunday after Epiphany
 GWV 1112/51:  (1751) - SATB, fl (2), fg, hn (2), str, bc - 1st Sunday after Epiphany

GWV 1113

 GWV 1113/12:  (1712) - SSATB, org, str, bc - 2nd Sunday after Epiphany
 GWV 1113/13:  (1713) - B, str, bc - 2nd Sunday after Epiphany
 GWV 1113/18:  (1718) - SATB, ob am, str, bc - 2nd Sunday after Epiphany
 GWV 1113/20:  (1720) - S, vl unis, bc - 2nd Sunday after Epiphany
 GWV 1113/23a:  (1723) - SATB, ob (2), clar, trb (3), str, bc - 2nd Sunday after Epiphany
 GWV 1113/23b:  (1723) - SATB, ob (2), clar (2), trb (3), timp(2), str, bc - 2nd Sunday after Epiphany
 GWV 1113/24:  (1724) - SATB, str, bc - 2nd Sunday after Epiphany
 GWV 1113/26:  (1726) - ATTB, str, bc - 2nd Sunday after Epiphany
 GWV 1113/28:  (1728) - SATB, ob (2), fg, str, bc - 2nd Sunday after Epiphany
 GWV 1113/29:  (1729) - SATB, str, bc - 2nd Sunday after Epiphany
 GWV 1113/31:  (1731) - SATB, str, bc - 2nd Sunday after Epiphany
 GWV 1113/32:  (1732) - SATB, str, bc - 2nd Sunday after Epiphany
 GWV 1113/35:  (1735) - SATB, chal (2)tb, str, bc - 2nd Sunday after Epiphany
 GWV 1113/37:  (1737) - SATB, str, bc - 2nd Sunday after Epiphany
 GWV 1113/39:  (1739) - SATBB, str, bc - 2nd Sunday after Epiphany
 GWV 1113/40:  (1740) - SATB, ob (2), chals, fg, str, bc - 2nd Sunday after Epiphany
 GWV 1113/41:  (1741) - SATB, ob (2), vl, str, bc - 2nd Sunday after Epiphany
 GWV 1113/42:  (1742) - SATB, (ob), str, bc - 2nd Sunday after Epiphany
 GWV 1113/43:  (1743) - SATB, str, bc - 2nd Sunday after Epiphany
 GWV 1113/45:  (1745) - SATB, str, bc - 2nd Sunday after Epiphany
 GWV 1113/47:  (1747) - SATB, str, bc - 2nd Sunday after Epiphany
 GWV 1113/50:  (1750) - SATB, str, bc - 2nd Sunday after Epiphany
 GWV 1113/54:  (1754) - SATB, fl, hn (2), str, bc - 2nd Sunday after Epiphany

GWV 1114

 GWV 1114/14:  (1714) - TB, ob (2), str, bc - 3rd Sunday after Epiphany
 GWV 1114/16:  (1716) - S, vl (2), str, bc - 3rd Sunday after Epiphany
 GWV 1114/19:  (1719) - SSATB, ob, str, bc - 3rd Sunday after Epiphany
 GWV 1114/21:  (1721) - SATB, fl, str, bc - 3rd Sunday after Epiphany
 GWV 1114/22:  (1722) - TB, str, bc - 3rd Sunday after Epiphany
 GWV 1114/25:  (1725) - SATB, str, bc - 3rd Sunday after Epiphany
 GWV 1114/27:  (1727) - SATB, str, bc - 3rd Sunday after Epiphany
 GWV 1114/30:  (1730) - SATB, fl am, ob am, str, bc - 3rd Sunday after Epiphany
 GWV 1114/33:  (1733) - SATB, str, bc - 3rd Sunday after Epiphany
 GWV 1114/36:  (1736) - SATB, str, bc - 3rd Sunday after Epiphany
 GWV 1114/37:  (1737) - SAT, str, bc - 3rd Sunday after Epiphany
 GWV 1114/38:  (1738) - SATB, str, bc - 3rd Sunday after Epiphany
 GWV 1114/40:  (1740) - SATB, ob (2), str, bc - 3rd Sunday after Epiphany
 GWV 1114/41:  (1741) - SATB, ob (2), str, bc - 3rd Sunday after Epiphany
 GWV 1114/43:  (1743) - SATB, ob, str, bc - 3rd Sunday after Epiphany
 GWV 1114/48:  (1748) - SATB, fl (2), hn (2), str, bc - 3rd Sunday after Epiphany
 GWV 1114/49:  (1749) - SATB, str, bc - 3rd Sunday after Epiphany
 GWV 1114/51:  (1751) - SATB, str, bc - 3rd Sunday after Epiphany

GWV 1115

 GWV 1115/13:  (1713) - S, ob (2), str, bc - 4th Sunday after Epiphany
 GWV 1115/18:  (1718) - SATB, str, bc - 4th Sunday after Epiphany
 GWV 1115/24:  (1724) - SATB, ob, fg/vc, org, str, bc - 4th Sunday after Epiphany
 GWV 1115/29:  (1729) - SATB, str, bc - 4th Sunday after Epiphany
 GWV 1115/34:  (1734) - SATB, str, bc - 4th Sunday after Epiphany
 GWV 1115/35:  (1735) - SATB, fl, chalt, str, bc - 4th Sunday after Epiphany
 GWV 1115/40:  (1740) - SATB, ob (2), str, bc - 4th Sunday after Epiphany
 GWV 1115/43:  (1743) - SATB, str, bc - 4th Sunday after Epiphany
 GWV 1115/46:  (1746) - ATB, str, bc - 4th Sunday after Epiphany
 GWV 1115/51:  (1751) - SATB, str, bc - 4th Sunday after Epiphany

GWV 1116

 GWV 1116/18:  (1718) - SATB, str, bc - 5th Sunday after Epiphany
 GWV 1116/26:  (1726) - SATB, ob (2), str, bc - 5th Sunday after Epiphany
 GWV 1116/29:  (1729) - SATB, str, bc - 5th Sunday after Epiphany
 GWV 1116/34:  (1734) - SATB, str, bc - 5th Sunday after Epiphany
 GWV 1116/37:  (1737) - SATB, str, bc - 5th Sunday after Epiphany
 GWV 1116/40:  (1740) - SATB, (fl), ob (2), fg, vl, str, bc - 5th Sunday after Epiphany

GWV 1117

 GWV 1117/13:  (1713) - SATB, ob (2), trb (3), str, bc - Septuagesima Sunday (9 weeks, 70 days before Easter)
 GWV 1117/16:  (1716) - B, str, bc - Septuagesima Sunday (9 weeks, 70 days before Easter)
 GWV 1117/19:  (1719) - SSTB, ob (2), fg, str, bc - Septuagesima Sunday (9 weeks, 70 days before Easter)
 GWV 1117/20:  (1720) - S, vl unis, bc - Septuagesima Sunday (9 weeks, 70 days before Easter)
 GWV 1117/21:  (1721) - SATB, str, bc - Septuagesima Sunday (9 weeks, 70 days before Easter)
 GWV 1117/24:  (1724) - SATB, str, bc - Septuagesima Sunday (9 weeks, 70 days before Easter)
 GWV 1117/27:  (1727) - SATB, str, bc - Septuagesima Sunday (9 weeks, 70 days before Easter)
 GWV 1117/28:  (1728) - SAT, str, bc - Septuagesima Sunday (9 weeks, 70 days before Easter)
 GWV 1117/32:  (1732) - ATB, str, bc - Septuagesima Sunday (9 weeks, 70 days before Easter)
 GWV 1117/34:  (1734) - SATB, str, bc - Septuagesima Sunday (9 weeks, 70 days before Easter)
 GWV 1117/35:  (1735) - SATB, ob (2), fg, str, bc - Septuagesima Sunday (9 weeks, 70 days before Easter)
 GWV 1117/40:  (1740) - SATB, fg, str, bc - Septuagesima Sunday (9 weeks, 70 days before Easter)
 GWV 1117/41:  (1741) - SATB, (ob), str, bc - Septuagesima Sunday (9 weeks, 70 days before Easter)
 GWV 1117/42:  (1742) - ATB, str, bc - Septuagesima Sunday (9 weeks, 70 days before Easter)
 GWV 1117/43:  (1743) - B, ob (2), str, bc - Septuagesima Sunday (9 weeks, 70 days before Easter)
 GWV 1117/44:  (1744) - SATB, str, bc - Septuagesima Sunday (9 weeks, 70 days before Easter)
 GWV 1117/46:  (1746) - SATB, str, bc - Septuagesima Sunday (9 weeks, 70 days before Easter)
 GWV 1117/47:  (1747) - SATB, str, bc - Septuagesima Sunday (9 weeks, 70 days before Easter)
 GWV 1117/53:  (1753) - SATB, fl (2), hn (2), str, bc - Septuagesima Sunday (9 weeks, 70 days before Easter)

GWV 1118

 GWV 1118/12a:  (1712) - SSATB, str, bc - Sexagesima Sunday (8 weeks, 60 days before Easter)
 GWV 1118/12b:  (1712) - S, str, bc - Sexagesima Sunday (8 weeks, 60 days before Easter)
 GWV 1118/15:  (1715) - S, ob (2), str, bc - Sexagesima Sunday (8 weeks, 60 days before Easter)
 GWV 1118/19:  (1719) - SATB, str, bc - Sexagesima Sunday (8 weeks, 60 days before Easter)
 GWV 1118/20:  (1720) - B, vl unis, bc - Sexagesima Sunday (8 weeks, 60 days before Easter)
 GWV 1118/23:  (1723) - SSTB, ob (2), str, bc - Sexagesima Sunday (8 weeks, 60 days before Easter)
 GWV 1118/26:  (1726) - ATTB, fl (2), fg, str, bc - Sexagesima Sunday (8 weeks, 60 days before Easter)
 GWV 1118/28:  (1728) - SAT, fl, ob, fg, str, bc - Sexagesima Sunday (8 weeks, 60 days before Easter)
 GWV 1118/29:  (1729) - SATB, ob (2), fg, str, bc - Sexagesima Sunday (8 weeks, 60 days before Easter)
 GWV 1118/30:  (1730) - SATB, str, bc - Sexagesima Sunday (8 weeks, 60 days before Easter)
 GWV 1118/31:  (1731) - SATB, str, bc - Sexagesima Sunday (8 weeks, 60 days before Easter)
 GWV 1118/39:  (1739) - SATB, str, bc - Sexagesima Sunday (8 weeks, 60 days before Easter)
 GWV 1118/40:  (1740) - SATB, chal (3)stb, str, bc - Sexagesima Sunday (8 weeks, 60 days before Easter)
 GWV 1118/41:  (1741) - SATB, str, bc - Sexagesima Sunday (8 weeks, 60 days before Easter)
 GWV 1118/42:  (1742) - SATB, ob, chal (2)tb, str, bc - Sexagesima Sunday (8 weeks, 60 days before Easter)
 GWV 1118/43:  (1743) - ATB, str, bc - Sexagesima Sunday (8 weeks, 60 days before Easter)
 GWV 1118/44:  (1744) - SATB, fg, str, bc - Sexagesima Sunday (8 weeks, 60 days before Easter)
 GWV 1118/46:  (1746) - SATB, str, bc - Sexagesima Sunday (8 weeks, 60 days before Easter)
 GWV 1118/47:  (1747) - SAB, str, bc - Sexagesima Sunday (8 weeks, 60 days before Easter)
 GWV 1118/48:  (1748) - SATB, str, bc - Sexagesima Sunday (8 weeks, 60 days before Easter)
 GWV 1118/49:  (1749) - ATB, str, bc - Sexagesima Sunday (8 weeks, 60 days before Easter)
 GWV 1118/50:  (1750) - SATB, fl (2), hn (2), str, bc - Sexagesima Sunday (8 weeks, 60 days before Easter)
 GWV 1118/51:  (1751) - SATB, str, bc - Sexagesima Sunday (8 weeks, 60 days before Easter)

GWV 1119

 GWV 1119/12:  (1712) - SSATB, str, bc - Quinquagesima Sunday (Estomihi)
 GWV 1119/13:  (1713) - SB, ob, str, bc - Quinquagesima Sunday (Estomihi)
 GWV 1119/14:  (1714) - TB, fl (2), ob, str, bc - Quinquagesima Sunday (Estomihi)
 GWV 1119/16:  (1716) - SSATB, fl/ob, str, bc - Quinquagesima Sunday (Estomihi)
 GWV 1119/19:  (1719) - SATB, str, bc - Quinquagesima Sunday (Estomihi)
 GWV 1119/21:  (1721) - SATB, str, bc - Quinquagesima Sunday (Estomihi)
 GWV 1119/22:  (1722) - B, str, bc - Quinquagesima Sunday (Estomihi)
 GWV 1119/23:  (1723) - SSTB, ob (2), str, bc - Quinquagesima Sunday (Estomihi)
 GWV 1119/24:  (1724) - SATB, str, bc - Quinquagesima Sunday (Estomihi)
 GWV 1119/25:  (1725) - T, ob, str, bc - Quinquagesima Sunday (Estomihi)
 GWV 1119/27:  (1727) - SATB, fl (2), ob (2), fg, str, bc - Quinquagesima Sunday (Estomihi)
 GWV 1119/28:  (1728) - SAT, str, bc - Quinquagesima Sunday (Estomihi)
 GWV 1119/31:  (1731) - SATB, str, bc - Quinquagesima Sunday (Estomihi)
 GWV 1119/32:  (1732) - ATB, (fl), vl, str, bc - Quinquagesima Sunday (Estomihi)
 GWV 1119/33:  (1733) - SATB, fl (2), str, bc - Quinquagesima Sunday (Estomihi)
 GWV 1119/34:  (1734) - SATB, fl, str, bc - Quinquagesima Sunday (Estomihi)
 GWV 1119/35:  (1735) - SATB, str, bc - Quinquagesima Sunday (Estomihi)
 GWV 1119/36:  (1736) - SATB, str, bc - Quinquagesima Sunday (Estomihi)
 GWV 1119/37:  (1737) - SATB, str, bc - Quinquagesima Sunday (Estomihi)
 GWV 1119/39:  (1739) - SATB, str, bc - Quinquagesima Sunday (Estomihi)
 GWV 1119/40:  (1740) - SATB, str, bc - Quinquagesima Sunday (Estomihi)
 GWV 1119/41:  (1741) - SATB, ob (2), violetta (2), vla (2), str, bc - Quinquagesima Sunday (Estomihi)
 GWV 1119/42:  (1742) - SATB, ob, str, bc - Quinquagesima Sunday (Estomihi)
 GWV 1119/43:  (1743) - ATB, ob, fg, str, bc - Quinquagesima Sunday (Estomihi)
 GWV 1119/44:  (1744) - SATB, str, bc - Quinquagesima Sunday (Estomihi)

GWV 1120

 GWV 1120/18:  (1718) - SSATB, ob, str, bc - Invocavit (1st Sunday in Lent)
 GWV 1120/19:  (1719) - SATB, str, bc - Invocavit (1st Sunday in Lent)
 GWV 1120/20:  (1720) - S, vl unis, bc - Invocavit (1st Sunday in Lent)
 GWV 1120/26:  (1726) - ATTB, fl (2), fg, str, bc - Invocavit (1st Sunday in Lent)
 GWV 1120/28:  (1728) - SAT, str, bc - Invocavit (1st Sunday in Lent)
 GWV 1120/30:  (1730) - SATB, str, bc - Invocavit (1st Sunday in Lent)
 GWV 1120/38:  (1738) - SATB, str, bc - Invocavit (1st Sunday in Lent)
 GWV 1120/40:  (1740) - SATB, str, bc - Invocavit (1st Sunday in Lent)
 GWV 1120/41:  (1741) - SATB, (ob), fg, vl (2), str, bc - Invocavit (1st Sunday in Lent)
 GWV 1120/42:  (1742) - SATB, clar, str, bc - Invocavit (1st Sunday in Lent)
 GWV 1120/43:  (1743) - ATB, ob, str, bc - Invocavit (1st Sunday in Lent)
 GWV 1120/44:  (1744) - SATB, str, bc - Invocavit (1st Sunday in Lent)
 GWV 1120/46:  (1746) - SATB, str, bc - Invocavit (1st Sunday in Lent)
 GWV 1120/47:  (1747) - SATB, str, bc - Invocavit (1st Sunday in Lent)
 GWV 1120/48:  (1748) - SATB, str, bc - Invocavit (1st Sunday in Lent)
 GWV 1120/49:  (1749) - ATB, str, bc - Invocavit (1st Sunday in Lent)
 GWV 1120/50:  (1750) - SATB, str, bc - Invocavit (1st Sunday in Lent)
 GWV 1120/51:  (1751) - SATB, str, bc - Invocavit (1st Sunday in Lent)
 GWV 1120/53:  (1753) - SATB, fl (2), fg (2), hn (2), str, bc - Invocavit (1st Sunday in Lent)

GWV 1121

 GWV 1121/12a:  (1712) - SATB, ob (2), str, bc - Reminiscere (2nd Sunday in Lent)
 GWV 1121/12b:  (1712) - S, vl unis, bc - Reminiscere (2nd Sunday in Lent)
 GWV 1121/13:  (1713) - B, ob (2), str, bc - Reminiscere (2nd Sunday in Lent)
 GWV 1121/14:  (1714) - SATB, ob (2), str, bc - Reminiscere (2nd Sunday in Lent)
 GWV 1121/16:  (1716) - SSATB, ob/org, str, bc - Reminiscere (2nd Sunday in Lent)
 GWV 1121/19:  (1719) - SATB, str, bc - Reminiscere (2nd Sunday in Lent)
 GWV 1121/21:  (1721) - SAT, str, bc - Reminiscere (2nd Sunday in Lent)
 GWV 1121/22:  (1722) - B, str, bc - Reminiscere (2nd Sunday in Lent)
 GWV 1121/23:  (1723) - SSTB, str, bc - Reminiscere (2nd Sunday in Lent)
 GWV 1121/24:  (1724) - SATTB, str, bc - Reminiscere (2nd Sunday in Lent)
 GWV 1121/25:  (1725) - SATB, str, bc - Reminiscere (2nd Sunday in Lent)
 GWV 1121/27:  (1727) - SATB, fl (2), ob (2), str, bc - Reminiscere (2nd Sunday in Lent)
 GWV 1121/28:  (1728) - SAT, str, bc - Reminiscere (2nd Sunday in Lent)
 GWV 1121/29:  (1729) - SATB, (ob), str, bc - Reminiscere (2nd Sunday in Lent)
 GWV 1121/31:  (1731) - SATB, str, bc - Reminiscere (2nd Sunday in Lent)
 GWV 1121/32:  (1732) - SATB, str, bc - Reminiscere (2nd Sunday in Lent)
 GWV 1121/33:  (1733) - SATB, str, bc - Reminiscere (2nd Sunday in Lent)
 GWV 1121/34:  (1734) - SAB, str, bc - Reminiscere (2nd Sunday in Lent)
 GWV 1121/35:  (1735) - SATB, str, bc - Reminiscere (2nd Sunday in Lent)
 GWV 1121/36:  (1736) - SATB, str, bc - Reminiscere (2nd Sunday in Lent)
 GWV 1121/37:  (1737) - SATB, str, bc - Reminiscere (2nd Sunday in Lent)
 GWV 1121/39:  (1739) - SATBB, chals, str, bc - Reminiscere (2nd Sunday in Lent)
 GWV 1121/40:  (1740) - SATTB, str, bc - Reminiscere (2nd Sunday in Lent)
 GWV 1121/41:  (1741) - SATB, chals, str, bc - Reminiscere (2nd Sunday in Lent)
 GWV 1121/42:  (1742) - SATB, ob, fg, str, bc - Reminiscere (2nd Sunday in Lent)
 GWV 1121/43:  (1743) - ATB, vl (2), str, bc - Reminiscere (2nd Sunday in Lent)
 GWV 1121/44:  (1744) - SATB, str, bc - Reminiscere (2nd Sunday in Lent)

GWV 1122

 GWV 1122/18:  (1718) - SSATB, str, bc - Oculi (3rd Sunday in Lent)
 GWV 1122/19:  (1719) - SATB, str, bc - Oculi (3rd Sunday in Lent)
 GWV 1122/20:  (1720) - B, vl unis, bc - Oculi (3rd Sunday in Lent)
 GWV 1122/26:  (1726) - SATB, fl (2), fg, str, bc - Oculi (3rd Sunday in Lent)
 GWV 1122/28:  (1728) - SAT, str, bc - Oculi (3rd Sunday in Lent)
 GWV 1122/29:  (1729) - ATB, fl (2), clar, str, bc - Oculi (3rd Sunday in Lent)
 GWV 1122/30:  (1730) - SATB, fg, str, bc - Oculi (3rd Sunday in Lent)
 GWV 1122/34:  (1734) - SATB, str, bc - Oculi (3rd Sunday in Lent)
 GWV 1122/38:  (1738) - SATB, str, bc - Oculi (3rd Sunday in Lent)
 GWV 1122/40:  (1740) - SATB, chals, str, bc - Oculi (3rd Sunday in Lent)
 GWV 1122/41:  (1741) - SATB, str, bc - Oculi (3rd Sunday in Lent)
 GWV 1122/42:  (1742) - SATB, str, bc - Oculi (3rd Sunday in Lent)
 GWV 1122/43:  (1743) - SATB, str, bc - Oculi (3rd Sunday in Lent)
 GWV 1122/44:  (1744) - SATB, str, bc - Oculi (3rd Sunday in Lent)
 GWV 1122/46:  (1746) - SATB, str, bc - Oculi (3rd Sunday in Lent)
 GWV 1122/47:  (1747) - SATB, fg, str, bc - Oculi (3rd Sunday in Lent)
 GWV 1122/48:  (1748) - SATB, str, bc - Oculi (3rd Sunday in Lent)
 GWV 1122/50:  (1750) - SATB, str, bc - Oculi (3rd Sunday in Lent)
 GWV 1122/51:  (1751) - SATB, hn (2), str, bc - Oculi (3rd Sunday in Lent)
 GWV 1122/53:  (1753) - SATB, fl (2), fg (2), hn (2), str, bc - Oculi (3rd Sunday in Lent)

GWV 1123

 GWV 1123/12:  (1712) - SATB, org, ob, fg, str, bc - Laetare (4th Sunday in Lent)
 GWV 1123/13:  (1713) - S, ob (2), str, bc - Laetare (4th Sunday in Lent)
 GWV 1123/15:  (1715) - SATB, ob (2), str, bc - Laetare (4th Sunday in Lent)
 GWV 1123/16:  (1716) - SSAB, str, bc - Laetare (4th Sunday in Lent)
 GWV 1123/18:  (1718) - S, ob am, str, bc - Laetare (4th Sunday in Lent)
 GWV 1123/21:  (1721) - SSTB, str, bc - Laetare (4th Sunday in Lent)
 GWV 1123/22:  (1722) - SSATB, ob, str, bc - Laetare (4th Sunday in Lent)
 GWV 1123/23:  (1723) - SSTB, str, bc - Laetare (4th Sunday in Lent)
 GWV 1123/24:  (1724) - SATB, str, bc - Laetare (4th Sunday in Lent)
 GWV 1123/25:  (1725) - SSTB, str, bc - Laetare (4th Sunday in Lent)
 GWV 1123/26:  (1726) - SATB, fl (2), fg, str, bc - Laetare (4th Sunday in Lent)
 GWV 1123/27:  (1727) - SATB, str, bc - Laetare (4th Sunday in Lent)
 GWV 1123/28:  (1728) - SAT, fl (2), ob(2), fg, str, bc - Laetare (4th Sunday in Lent)
 GWV 1123/29:  (1729) - SATB, fg, str, bc - Laetare (4th Sunday in Lent)
 GWV 1123/31:  (1731) - SATB, str, bc - Laetare (4th Sunday in Lent)
 GWV 1123/32:  (1732) - SATB, str, bc - Laetare (4th Sunday in Lent)
 GWV 1123/33:  (1733) - SATB, str, bc - Laetare (4th Sunday in Lent)
 GWV 1123/35:  (1735) - SATB, str, bc - Laetare (4th Sunday in Lent)
 GWV 1123/36:  (1736) - SATB, str, bc - Laetare (4th Sunday in Lent)
 GWV 1123/39:  (1739) - SATBB, str, bc - Laetare (4th Sunday in Lent)
 GWV 1123/40:  (1740) - SATB, str, bc - Laetare (4th Sunday in Lent)
 GWV 1123/41:  (1741) - SATB, ob (am)(2), fg, vl, str, bc - Laetare (4th Sunday in Lent)
 GWV 1123/42:  (1742) - SATB, str, bc - Laetare (4th Sunday in Lent)
 GWV 1123/43:  (1743) - ATB, ob, chal (2)tb, str, bc - Laetare (4th Sunday in Lent)
 GWV 1123/44:  (1744) - SATB, str, bc - Laetare (4th Sunday in Lent)
 GWV 1123/46:  (1746) - SATB, str, bc - Laetare (4th Sunday in Lent)
 GWV 1123/49:  (1749) - ATB, str, bc - Laetare (4th Sunday in Lent)

GWV 1124

 GWV 1124/20:  (1720) - B, ob (2), fg, str, bc - Judica (5th Sunday in Lent)
 GWV 1124/24:  (1724) - SATB, fl, str, bc - Judica (5th Sunday in Lent)
 GWV 1124/27:  (1727) - SATB, fl (2), str, bc - Judica (5th Sunday in Lent)
 GWV 1124/28:  (1728) - SATB, fl (2), ob (2), fg, str, bc - Judica (5th Sunday in Lent)
 GWV 1124/32:  (1732) - SAT, vl, str, bc - Judica (5th Sunday in Lent)
 GWV 1124/34:  (1734) - SATBB, fl/ob, str, bc - Judica (5th Sunday in Lent)
 GWV 1124/35:  (1735) - SATB, str, bc - Judica (5th Sunday in Lent)
 GWV 1124/37:  (1737) - SATB, chal (2)tb, str, bc - Judica (5th Sunday in Lent)
 GWV 1124/38:  (1738) - SATBB, str, bc - Judica (5th Sunday in Lent)
 GWV 1124/40:  (1740) - SATB, str, bc - Judica (5th Sunday in Lent)
 GWV 1124/41:  (1741) - SATB, ob (2), fg, vl (2), str, bc - Judica (5th Sunday in Lent)
 GWV 1124/42:  (1742) - SATB, str, bc - Judica (5th Sunday in Lent)
 GWV 1124/43:  (1743) - SATB, str, bc - Judica (5th Sunday in Lent)
 GWV 1124/44:  (1744) - SATB, chal (2)tb, str, bc - Judica (5th Sunday in Lent)
 GWV 1124/47:  (1747) - SATB, str, bc - Judica (5th Sunday in Lent)
 GWV 1124/50:  (1750) - SATB, hn (2), str, bc - Judica (5th Sunday in Lent)
 GWV 1124/53:  (1753) - SATB, str, bc - Judica (5th Sunday in Lent)

GWV 1125

 GWV 1125/13:  (1713) - SSATB, str, bc - Palm Sunday
 GWV 1125/15:  (1715) - SATB, ob, str, bc - Palm Sunday
 GWV 1125/18:  (1718) - SATB, ob, str, bc - Palm Sunday
 GWV 1125/19:  (1719) - SATB, ob (2), str, bc - Palm Sunday
 GWV 1125/23:  (1723) - SSTB, ob, vla d'am, str, bc - Palm Sunday
 GWV 1125/25:  (1725) - SSTB, hn (2), str, bc - Palm Sunday
 GWV 1125/26:  (1726) - SATB, fl (2), ob (2), fg, str, bc - Palm Sunday
 GWV 1125/29:  (1729) - SATB, fl, (ob), str, bc - Palm Sunday
 GWV 1125/31:  (1731) - SATB, str, bc - Palm Sunday
 GWV 1125/36:  (1736) - SATB, ob (am) (2), viol(ett)a (2), str, bc - Palm Sunday
 GWV 1125/38:  (1738) - SATBB, ob, chal (2)ab, str, bc - Palm Sunday
 GWV 1125/39:  (1739) - AATTBB, ob (2), fg, chals, vla (2), str, bc - Palm Sunday
 GWV 1125/40:  (1740) - SATB, ob (2), vl (2), str, bc - Palm Sunday
 GWV 1125/41:  (1741) - SATB, ob/fl, chal (3)stb, fg, str, bc - Palm Sunday
 GWV 1125/42:  (1742) - SATB, ob (2), fg, clar, vl, str, bc - Palm Sunday
 GWV 1125/43:  (1743) - SATB, fg, vl, str, bc - Palm Sunday
 GWV 1125/44:  (1744) - SATB, hn (2), timp (4), str, bc - Palm Sunday
 GWV 1125/46:  (1746) - SATB, str, bc - Palm Sunday
 GWV 1125/48:  (1748) - SATB, hn (2), str, bc - Palm Sunday
 GWV 1125/49:  (1749) - SATB, str, bc - Palm Sunday
 GWV 1125/50:  (1750) - SATB, hn (2), str, bc - Palm Sunday

GWV 1126

 GWV 1126/16:  (1716) - SATB, str, bc - Maundy Thursday
 GWV 1126/21:  (1721) - SSB, str, bc - Maundy Thursday
 GWV 1126/22:  (1722) - SSATB, str, bc - Maundy Thursday
 GWV 1126/24:  (1724) - SATB, str, bc - Maundy Thursday
 GWV 1126/28:  (1728) - SATB, str, bc - Maundy Thursday
 GWV 1126/32:  (1732) - SATB, str, bc - Maundy Thursday
 GWV 1126/33:  (1733) - ATB, str, bc - Maundy Thursday
 GWV 1126/34:  (1734) - SATB, str, bc - Maundy Thursday
 GWV 1126/35:  (1735) - SATB, str, bc - Maundy Thursday
 GWV 1126/37:  (1737) - SATB, str, bc - Maundy Thursday
 GWV 1126/39:  (1739) - SATB, ob (2), chal (3)atb, str, bc - Maundy Thursday
 GWV 1126/40:  (1740) - SATB, ob (2), fg, str, bc - Maundy Thursday
 GWV 1126/41:  (1741) - SATB, (fl), ob (3), fg, violetta (2), str, bc - Maundy Thursday
 GWV 1126/42:  (1742) - ATB, str, bc - Maundy Thursday
 GWV 1126/43:  (1743) - SATB, str, bc - Maundy Thursday
 GWV 1126/45:  (1745) - ATB, str, bc - Maundy Thursday
 GWV 1126/47:  (1747) - ATB, str, bc - Maundy Thursday

GWV 1127

 GWV 1127/14:  (1714) - STB, str, bc - Good Friday
 GWV 1127/16:  (1716) - S, fg, str, bc - Good Friday
 GWV 1127/18:  (1718) - SATB, ob, str, bc - Good Friday
 GWV 1127/19:  (1719) - SATB, str, bc - Good Friday
 GWV 1127/20:  (1720) - SSB, str, bc - Good Friday
 GWV 1127/25:  (1725) - SSATB, str, bc - Good Friday
 GWV 1127/26:  (1726) - SATB, fl (2), ob (2), fg, clar (2), timp (2), vl, vla am, str, bc - Good Friday
 GWV 1127/29:  (1729) - (S)ATB, str, bc - Good Friday
 GWV 1127/30:  (1730) - SATB, fl am, ob am, str, bc - Good Friday
 GWV 1127/31:  (1731) - SATB, str, bc - Good Friday
 GWV 1127/36:  (1736) - SSATB, fl, chal (2), str, bc - Good Friday
 GWV 1127/38:  (1738) - SATB, ob am (2), str, bc - Good Friday
 GWV 1127/40:  (1740) - SATB, chal (3)stb, fg, vl, str, bc - Good Friday
 GWV 1127/41:  (1741) - SATB, fl (2), ob (2), fg, str, bc - Good Friday
 GWV 1127/42:  (1742) - SATB, ob (2), fg, str, bc - Good Friday
 GWV 1127/43:  (1743) - SATB, chal (2)tb, str, bc - Good Friday
 GWV 1127/44:  (1744) - SATB, str, bc - Good Friday
 GWV 1127/46:  (1746) - SATB, str, bc - Good Friday
 GWV 1127/48:  (1748) - SATB, str, bc - Good Friday
 GWV 1127/49:  (1749) - SATB, fl (2), str, bc - Good Friday
 GWV 1127/50:  (1750) - SATB, str, bc - Good Friday

GWV 1128

 GWV 1128/12:  (1712) - SSATB, ob (2), fg, clar (2), timp (2), str, bc - Easter Sunday
 GWV 1128/21:  (1721) - SSB, ob (2), str, bc - Easter Sunday
 GWV 1128/22:  (1722) - SSATB, clar (2), timp (2), str, bc - Easter Sunday
 GWV 1128/23:  (1723) - SATB, ob (3), clar (2), timp (2), str, bc - Easter Sunday
 GWV 1128/24:  (1724) - SATB, vla am (?), clar (2), timp (2), str, bc - Easter Sunday
 GWV 1128/27:  (1727) - SATB, fl (2), ob (2), clar (2), timp (2), str, bc - Easter Sunday
 GWV 1128/28:  (1728) - SATB, fl (2), fg, clar (2), timp (2), str, bc - Easter Sunday
 GWV 1128/32:  (1732) - SATB, fl (2), clar (2), timp (2), str, bc - Easter Sunday
 GWV 1128/33:  (1733) - SATB, fl, hn (2), str, bc - Easter Sunday
 GWV 1128/34:  (1734) - SATB, fl, (ob), clar (2), timp (2), str, bc - Easter Sunday
 GWV 1128/35:  (1735) - SSATB, chal (2)tb, hn (2), timp (2), str, bc - Easter Sunday
 GWV 1128/37:  (1737) - SATB, fl (2), chal (2)tb, fg, clar (2), timp (2), str, bc - Easter Sunday
 GWV 1128/39:  (1739) - AATTBB, ob (2), fg, clar (2), timp (2), str, bc - Easter Sunday
 GWV 1128/40:  (1740) - SATB, ob (2), chals, clar (2), timp (2), str, bc - Easter Sunday
 GWV 1128/41:  (1741) - SATB, ob (2), fg, clar (2), timp (2), str, bc - Easter Sunday
 GWV 1128/42:  (1742) - SATB, ob (2), clar (2), timp (2), str, bc - Easter Sunday
 GWV 1128/43:  (1743) - SATB, str, bc - Easter Sunday
 GWV 1128/44:  (1744) - SATB, (ob), hn (2), timp (2), str, bc - Easter Sunday
 GWV 1128/45:  (1745) - ATB, clar (2), str, bc - Easter Sunday
 GWV 1128/47:  (1747) - ATB, chal (2)tb, hn (2), clar (2), timp (4), str, bc - Easter Sunday
 GWV 1128/53:  (1753) - SATB, hn (2), clar (2), timp (4), str, bc - Easter Sunday

GWV 1129

 GWV 1129/13:  (1713) - ATB, str, bc - 2nd day of Easter (Easter Monday)
 GWV 1129/14:  (1714) - SB, ob, str, bc - 2nd day of Easter (Easter Monday)
 GWV 1129/15:  (1715) - SSSATB, clar (2), timp (2), str, bc - 2nd day of Easter (Easter Monday), on the "Heut triumphieret Gottes Sohn" hymn by Bartholomäus Gesius
 GWV 1129/16:  (1716) - S, ob (2), str, bc - 2nd day of Easter (Easter Monday)
 GWV 1129/18:  (1718) - SSATB, str, bc - 2nd day of Easter (Easter Monday)
 GWV 1129/19:  (1719) - SATB, str, bc - 2nd day of Easter (Easter Monday)
 GWV 1129/20:  (1720) - B, str, bc - 2nd day of Easter (Easter Monday)
 GWV 1129/25:  (1725) - SSATB, ob, clar (2), timp (2), str, bc - 2nd day of Easter (Easter Monday)
 GWV 1129/26:  (1726) - SATB, ob (2), str, bc - 2nd day of Easter (Easter Monday)
 GWV 1129/27:  (1727) - SATB, str, bc - 2nd day of Easter (Easter Monday)
 GWV 1129/29:  (1729) - SATB, fl/ob, str, bc - 2nd day of Easter (Easter Monday)
 GWV 1129/30:  (1730) - SATB, fl am, ob am, str, bc - 2nd day of Easter (Easter Monday)
 GWV 1129/31:  (1731) - SATB, str, bc - 2nd day of Easter (Easter Monday)
 GWV 1129/36:  (1736) - SSATB, fl (2), str, bc - 2nd day of Easter (Easter Monday)
 GWV 1129/40:  (1740) - SATTB, vl, str, bc - 2nd day of Easter (Easter Monday)
 GWV 1129/41:  (1741) - SATB, str, bc - 2nd day of Easter (Easter Monday)
 GWV 1129/42:  (1742) - SATB, str, bc - 2nd day of Easter (Easter Monday)
 GWV 1129/43:  (1743) - SATB, str, bc - 2nd day of Easter (Easter Monday)
 GWV 1129/44:  (1744) - SATB, (ob), str, bc - 2nd day of Easter (Easter Monday)
 GWV 1129/46:  (1746) - SATB, chal (2)tb, fg, str, bc - 2nd day of Easter (Easter Monday)
 GWV 1129/48:  (1748) - SATB, str, bc - 2nd day of Easter (Easter Monday)
 GWV 1129/49:  (1749) - SATB, str, bc - 2nd day of Easter (Easter Monday)
 GWV 1129/50:  (1750) - SATB, (fl (2)), hn (2), str, bc - 2nd day of Easter (Easter Monday)

GWV 1130

 GWV 1130/12:  (1712) - SSSATB, str, bc - 3rd day of Easter (Easter Tuesday)
 GWV 1130/21:  (1721) - SSB, fl, str, bc - 3rd day of Easter (Easter Tuesday)
 GWV 1130/22:  (1722) - SSATB, ob (2), fg, str, bc - 3rd day of Easter (Easter Tuesday)
 GWV 1130/24:  (1724) - SATB, str, bc - 3rd day of Easter (Easter Tuesday)
 GWV 1130/28:  (1728) - SATB, str, bc - 3rd day of Easter (Easter Tuesday)
 GWV 1130/32:  (1732) - SATB, fl (2), str, bc - 3rd day of Easter (Easter Tuesday)
 GWV 1130/34:  (1734) - SATB, str, bc - 3rd day of Easter (Easter Tuesday)
 GWV 1130/35:  (1735) - SATB, str, bc - 3rd day of Easter (Easter Tuesday)
 GWV 1130/37:  (1737) - SATB, fl, (ob), fg, vc, str, bc - 3rd day of Easter (Easter Tuesday)
 GWV 1130/39:  (1739) - SATB, vl (2), str, bc - 3rd day of Easter (Easter Tuesday)
 GWV 1130/40:  (1740) - SATB, fl/violetta, str, bc - 3rd day of Easter (Easter Tuesday)
 GWV 1130/41:  (1741) - SATB, str, bc - 3rd day of Easter (Easter Tuesday)
 GWV 1130/42:  (1742) - SATB, ob (2), str, bc - 3rd day of Easter (Easter Tuesday)
 GWV 1130/45:  (1745) - ATB, str, bc - 3rd day of Easter (Easter Tuesday)
 GWV 1130/47:  (1747) - ATB, str, bc - 3rd day of Easter (Easter Tuesday)
 GWV 1130/50:  (1750) - ATB, str, bc - 3rd day of Easter (Easter Tuesday)
 GWV 1130/52:  (1752) - SATB, str, bc - 3rd day of Easter (Easter Tuesday)

GWV 1131

 GWV 1131/13:  (1713) - S, ob (2), str, bc - Quasimodogeniti (1st Sunday after Easter)
 GWV 1131/16:  (1716) - SATB, vl (2), str, bc - Quasimodogeniti (1st Sunday after Easter)
 GWV 1131/18:  (1718) - B, str, bc - Quasimodogeniti (1st Sunday after Easter)
 GWV 1131/19:  (1719) - SATB, str, bc - Quasimodogeniti (1st Sunday after Easter)
 GWV 1131/20:  (1720) - SB, str, bc - Quasimodogeniti (1st Sunday after Easter)
 GWV 1131/24:  (1724) - SATB, str, bc - Quasimodogeniti (1st Sunday after Easter)
 GWV 1131/25:  (1725) - SATB, str, bc - Quasimodogeniti (1st Sunday after Easter)
 GWV 1131/26:  (1726) - SATB, fl (2), fg, str, bc - Quasimodogeniti (1st Sunday after Easter)
 GWV 1131/27:  (1727) - SATB, str, bc - Quasimodogeniti (1st Sunday after Easter)
 GWV 1131/28:  (1728) - SATB, str, bc - Quasimodogeniti (1st Sunday after Easter)
 GWV 1131/29:  (1729) - SATB, str, bc - Quasimodogeniti (1st Sunday after Easter)
 GWV 1131/31:  (1731) - SATB, str, bc - Quasimodogeniti (1st Sunday after Easter)
 GWV 1131/36:  (1736) - SATB, str, bc - Quasimodogeniti (1st Sunday after Easter)
 GWV 1131/38:  (1738) - SATB, str, bc - Quasimodogeniti (1st Sunday after Easter)
 GWV 1131/40:  (1740) - SATB, str, bc - Quasimodogeniti (1st Sunday after Easter)
 GWV 1131/42:  (1742) - SATB, str, bc - Quasimodogeniti (1st Sunday after Easter)
 GWV 1131/43:  (1743) - SAB, str, bc - Quasimodogeniti (1st Sunday after Easter)
 GWV 1131/44:  (1744) - S, str, bc - Quasimodogeniti (1st Sunday after Easter)
 GWV 1131/46:  (1746) - SATB, str, bc - Quasimodogeniti (1st Sunday after Easter)
 GWV 1131/47:  (1747) - ATB, str, bc - Quasimodogeniti (1st Sunday after Easter)
 GWV 1131/48:  (1748) - SATB, str, bc - Quasimodogeniti (1st Sunday after Easter)
 GWV 1131/49:  (1749) - ATB, str, bc - Quasimodogeniti (1st Sunday after Easter)
 GWV 1131/50:  (1750) - SATB, str, bc - Quasimodogeniti (1st Sunday after Easter)

GWV 1132

 GWV 1132/12a:  (1712) - SSATB, ob (2), str, bc - Misericordas Domini (2nd Sunday after Easter)
 GWV 1132/12b:  (1712) - S, (fl (2)), str, bc - Misericordas Domini (2nd Sunday after Easter)
 GWV 1132/21:  (1721) - SSTB, ob (2), str, bc - Misericordas Domini (2nd Sunday after Easter)
 GWV 1132/22:  (1722) - SSATB, hn, str, bc - Misericordas Domini (2nd Sunday after Easter)
 GWV 1132/24:  (1724) - SATB, str, bc - Misericordas Domini (2nd Sunday after Easter)
 GWV 1132/25:  (1725) - SATB, str, bc - Misericordas Domini (2nd Sunday after Easter)
 GWV 1132/32:  (1732) - SATB, str, bc - Misericordas Domini (2nd Sunday after Easter)
 GWV 1132/33:  (1733) - SATB, str, bc - Misericordas Domini (2nd Sunday after Easter)
 GWV 1132/34:  (1734) - SATB, fl (2), str, bc - Misericordas Domini (2nd Sunday after Easter)
 GWV 1132/35:  (1735) - SATB, str, bc - Misericordas Domini (2nd Sunday after Easter)
 GWV 1132/37:  (1737) - SATB, str, bc - Misericordas Domini (2nd Sunday after Easter)
 GWV 1132/39:  (1739) - SATB, chal (2)at, hn, str, bc - Misericordas Domini (2nd Sunday after Easter)
 GWV 1132/40:  (1740) - SATB, (fl), str, bc - Misericordas Domini (2nd Sunday after Easter)
 GWV 1132/42:  (1742) - SATB, str, bc - Misericordas Domini (2nd Sunday after Easter)
 GWV 1132/43:  (1743) - SATB, str, bc - Misericordas Domini (2nd Sunday after Easter)
 GWV 1132/45:  (1745) - ATB, hn, str, bc - Misericordas Domini (2nd Sunday after Easter)
 GWV 1132/47:  (1747) - ATB, str, bc - Misericordas Domini (2nd Sunday after Easter)
 GWV 1132/53:  (1753) - SATB, fl (2), fg (2), hn (2), str, bc - Misericordas Domini (2nd Sunday after Easter)

GWV 1133

 GWV 1133/11:  (1711) - S, fl, ob (2), str, bc - Jubilate (3rd Sunday after Easter)
 GWV 1133/13:  (1713) - SSTB, ob (2), str, bc - Jubilate (3rd Sunday after Easter)
 GWV 1133/18:  (1718) - SSAB, str, bc - Jubilate (3rd Sunday after Easter)
 GWV 1133/19:  (1719) - SATB, str, bc - Jubilate (3rd Sunday after Easter)
 GWV 1133/20:  (1720) - SSB, str, bc - Jubilate (3rd Sunday after Easter)
 GWV 1133/27:  (1727) - SATB, str, bc - Jubilate (3rd Sunday after Easter)
 GWV 1133/28:  (1728) - SATB, fl, ob (2), fg, str, bc - Jubilate (3rd Sunday after Easter)
 GWV 1133/29:  (1729) - SATB, fl/ob, str, bc - Jubilate (3rd Sunday after Easter)
 GWV 1133/30:  (1730) - SATB, str, bc - Jubilate (3rd Sunday after Easter)
 GWV 1133/36:  (1736) - SSATB, chal (2)tb, fg, str, bc - Jubilate (3rd Sunday after Easter)
 GWV 1133/40:  (1740) - SATB, str, bc - Jubilate (3rd Sunday after Easter)
 GWV 1133/41:  (1741) - SATB, str, bc - Jubilate (3rd Sunday after Easter)
 GWV 1133/42:  (1742) - SATB, str, bc - Jubilate (3rd Sunday after Easter)
 GWV 1133/43:  (1743) - SATB, str, bc - Jubilate (3rd Sunday after Easter)
 GWV 1133/44:  (1744) - SATB, str, bc - Jubilate (3rd Sunday after Easter)
 GWV 1133/45:  (1745) - ATB, str, bc - Jubilate (3rd Sunday after Easter)
 GWV 1133/46:  (1746) - SAB, str, bc - Jubilate (3rd Sunday after Easter)
 GWV 1133/48:  (1748) - SAB, str, bc - Jubilate (3rd Sunday after Easter)
 GWV 1133/51:  (1751) - SATB, str, bc - Jubilate (3rd Sunday after Easter)
 GWV 1133/53:  (1753) - SATB, str, bc - Jubilate (3rd Sunday after Easter)

GWV 1134

 GWV 1134/20:  (1720) - S, str, bc - Cantate (4th Sunday after Easter)
 GWV 1134/21:  (1721) - TB, str, bc - Cantate (4th Sunday after Easter)
 GWV 1134/22:  (1722) - SSATB, ob (2), fg, str, bc - Cantate (4th Sunday after Easter)
 GWV 1134/23:  (1723) - SATB, str, bc - Cantate (4th Sunday after Easter)
 GWV 1134/24:  (1724) - SATB, str, bc - Cantate (4th Sunday after Easter)
 GWV 1134/25:  (1725) - SATB, ob, fg, str, bc - Cantate (4th Sunday after Easter)
 GWV 1134/26:  (1726) - SATB, fl (2), ob (2), fg, str, bc - Cantate (4th Sunday after Easter)
 GWV 1134/32:  (1732) - SATB, str, bc - Cantate (4th Sunday after Easter)
 GWV 1134/33:  (1733) - SATB, str, bc - Cantate (4th Sunday after Easter)
 GWV 1134/34:  (1734) - SATB, str, bc - Cantate (4th Sunday after Easter)
 GWV 1134/35:  (1735) - SATB, fl, chal (2)tb, str, bc - Cantate (4th Sunday after Easter)
 GWV 1134/37:  (1737) - SATB, fl, ob, str, bc - Cantate (4th Sunday after Easter)
 GWV 1134/39:  (1739) - SATB, str, bc - Cantate (4th Sunday after Easter)
 GWV 1134/40:  (1740) - SATB, chal (3)stb, violetta (2), str, bc - Cantate (4th Sunday after Easter)
 GWV 1134/41:  (1741) - SATB, ob, str, bc - Cantate (4th Sunday after Easter)
 GWV 1134/42:  (1742) - ATB, ob, str, bc - Cantate (4th Sunday after Easter)
 GWV 1134/43:  (1743) - SATB, ob, str, bc - Cantate (4th Sunday after Easter)
 GWV 1134/44:  (1744) - SATB, str, bc - Cantate (4th Sunday after Easter)
 GWV 1134/47:  (1747) - ATB, str, bc - Cantate (4th Sunday after Easter)
 GWV 1134/53:  (1753) - SATB, hn (2), str, bc - Cantate (4th Sunday after Easter)

GWV 1135

 GWV 1135/13:  (1713) - B, ob (2), str, bc - Rogate (5th Sunday after Easter)
 GWV 1135/18:  (1718) - SSAB, str, bc - Rogate (5th Sunday after Easter)
 GWV 1135/19:  (1719) - STB, str, bc - Rogate (5th Sunday after Easter)
 GWV 1135/24:  (1724) - SATB, ob (2), fg, str, bc - Rogate (5th Sunday after Easter)
 GWV 1135/26:  (1726) - SATB, (fl), ob (2), fg, str, bc - Rogate (5th Sunday after Easter)
 GWV 1135/27:  (1727) - SATB, str, bc - Rogate (5th Sunday after Easter)
 GWV 1135/29:  (1729) - SATB, str, bc - Rogate (5th Sunday after Easter)
 GWV 1135/30:  (1730) - SATB, str, bc - Rogate (5th Sunday after Easter)
 GWV 1135/36:  (1736) - SATB, str, bc - Rogate (5th Sunday after Easter)
 GWV 1135/38:  (1738) - SATBB, fg, str, bc - Rogate (5th Sunday after Easter)
 GWV 1135/40:  (1740) - SATB, str, bc - Rogate (5th Sunday after Easter)
 GWV 1135/41:  (1741) - SATB, ob, str, bc - Rogate (5th Sunday after Easter)
 GWV 1135/42:  (1742) - ATB, ob (2), str, bc - Rogate (5th Sunday after Easter)
 GWV 1135/43:  (1743) - SATB, str, bc - Rogate (5th Sunday after Easter)
 GWV 1135/44:  (1744) - SATB, str, bc - Rogate (5th Sunday after Easter)
 GWV 1135/46:  (1746) - SATB, chal (2)tb(/fg (2)), str, bc - Rogate (5th Sunday after Easter)
 GWV 1135/48:  (1748) - ATB, str, bc - Rogate (5th Sunday after Easter)
 GWV 1135/50:  (1750) - SATB, str, bc - Rogate (5th Sunday after Easter)
 GWV 1135/51:  (1751) - SATB, str, bc - Rogate (5th Sunday after Easter)
 GWV 1135/53:  (1753) - SATB, fl (2), fg, vla, str, bc - Rogate (5th Sunday after Easter)

GWV 1136

 GWV 1136/11:  (1711) - S, ob (2), fg, str, bc - Ascension Day
 GWV 1136/21:  (1721) - SSATB, clar (2), timp (2), str, bc - Ascension Day
 GWV 1136/22:  (1722) - SSATB, ob (2), fg, str, bc - Ascension Day
 GWV 1136/23:  (1723) - SATB, str, bc - Ascension Day
 GWV 1136/25:  (1725) - SSATB, clar (2), timp (2), str, bc - Ascension Day
 GWV 1136/28:  (1728) - SATB, str, bc - Ascension Day
 GWV 1136/32:  (1732) - SATB, str, bc - Ascension Day
 GWV 1136/33:  (1733) - SATB, fl, str, bc - Ascension Day
 GWV 1136/34:  (1734) - SATB, clar (2), timp (2), str, bc - Ascension Day
 GWV 1136/35:  (1735) - SSATB, fl (2), ob, str, bc - Ascension Day
 GWV 1136/37:  (1737) - SATB, str, bc - Ascension Day
 GWV 1136/39:  (1739) - SATB, str, bc - Ascension Day
 GWV 1136/40:  (1740) - SATB, ob (2), hn (2), timp (2), str, bc - Ascension Day
 GWV 1136/41:  (1741) - SATB, ob (2), hn (2), timp (4), str, bc - Ascension Day
 GWV 1136/42:  (1742) - STB, str, bc - Ascension Day
 GWV 1136/43:  (1743) - SATB, str, bc - Ascension Day
 GWV 1136/45:  (1745) - ATB, clar, str, bc - Ascension Day
 GWV 1136/47:  (1747) - ATB, str, bc - Ascension Day
 GWV 1136/53:  (1753) - SATB, fl (2), fg (2), hn (2), timp (4), str, bc - Ascension Day

GWV 1137

 GWV 1137/13:  (1713) - S, vl (2), str, bc - Exaudi (Sunday after Ascension, 6th Sunday after Easter)
 GWV 1137/16:  (1716) - B, vl (2), bc - Exaudi (Sunday after Ascension, 6th Sunday after Easter)
 GWV 1137/18:  (1718) - S, str, bc - Exaudi (Sunday after Ascension, 6th Sunday after Easter)
 GWV 1137/19:  (1719) - STB, str, bc - Exaudi (Sunday after Ascension, 6th Sunday after Easter)
 GWV 1137/20:  (1720) - B, vl unis, bc - Exaudi (Sunday after Ascension, 6th Sunday after Easter)
 GWV 1137/24:  (1724) - SATB, str, bc - Exaudi (Sunday after Ascension, 6th Sunday after Easter)
 GWV 1137/26:  (1726) - SATB, ob (2), fg, str, bc - Exaudi (Sunday after Ascension, 6th Sunday after Easter)
 GWV 1137/27:  (1727) - SATB, fl (2), ob (2), fg, str, bc - Exaudi (Sunday after Ascension, 6th Sunday after Easter)
 GWV 1137/29:  (1729) - SATB, str, bc - Exaudi (Sunday after Ascension, 6th Sunday after Easter)
 GWV 1137/30:  (1730) - SATB, str, bc - Exaudi (Sunday after Ascension, 6th Sunday after Easter)
 GWV 1137/36:  (1736) - SATB, str, bc - Exaudi (Sunday after Ascension, 6th Sunday after Easter)
 GWV 1137/38:  (1738) - SATBB, str, bc - Exaudi (Sunday after Ascension, 6th Sunday after Easter)
 GWV 1137/40:  (1740) - SATB, str, bc - Exaudi (Sunday after Ascension, 6th Sunday after Easter)
 GWV 1137/41:  (1741) - SATB, str, bc - Exaudi (Sunday after Ascension, 6th Sunday after Easter)
 GWV 1137/42:  (1742) - B, str, bc - Exaudi (Sunday after Ascension, 6th Sunday after Easter)
 GWV 1137/43:  (1743) - SATB, str, bc - Exaudi (Sunday after Ascension, 6th Sunday after Easter)
 GWV 1137/44:  (1744) - SATB, str, bc - Exaudi (Sunday after Ascension, 6th Sunday after Easter)
 GWV 1137/46:  (1746) - SATB, str, bc - Exaudi (Sunday after Ascension, 6th Sunday after Easter)
 GWV 1137/48:  (1748) - ATB, str, bc - Exaudi (Sunday after Ascension, 6th Sunday after Easter)
 GWV 1137/49:  (1749) - SATB, str, bc - Exaudi (Sunday after Ascension, 6th Sunday after Easter)
 GWV 1137/50:  (1750) - SATB, str, bc - Exaudi (Sunday after Ascension, 6th Sunday after Easter)
 GWV 1137/51:  (1751) - SATB, fg, str, bc - Exaudi (Sunday after Ascension, 6th Sunday after Easter)
 GWV 1137/53:  (1753) - SATB, str, bc - Exaudi (Sunday after Ascension, 6th Sunday after Easter)

GWV 1138

 GWV 1138/11:  (1711) - S, ob (2), (fg), str, bc - Whit Sunday (1st Day of Pentecost)
 GWV 1138/12:  (1712) - SSSATB, ob (2), str, bc - Whit Sunday (1st Day of Pentecost)
 GWV 1138/18:  (1718) - SSATB, str, bc - Whit Sunday (1st Day of Pentecost)
 GWV 1138/21:  (1721) - SSATB, fl (2), ob (2), str, bc - Whit Sunday (1st Day of Pentecost)
 GWV 1138/22:  (1722) - SSATB, ob (2), str, bc - Whit Sunday (1st Day of Pentecost)
 GWV 1138/23:  (1723) - ATB, fl, str, bc - Whit Sunday (1st Day of Pentecost)
 GWV 1138/24:  (1724) - SSATB, clar (2), timp (2), str, bc - Whit Sunday (1st Day of Pentecost)
 GWV 1138/25:  (1725) - SSATB, fl, ob, fg, clar (2), timp (2), str, bc - Whit Sunday (1st Day of Pentecost)
 GWV 1138/28:  (1728) - SATB, fl, ob (2), fg, clar (2), timp (2), vl (2), str, bc - Whit Sunday (1st Day of Pentecost)
 GWV 1138/32:  (1732) - SATB, fl, fg, clar (2), timp (2), str, bc - Whit Sunday (1st Day of Pentecost)
 GWV 1138/33:  (1733) - SATB, str, bc - Whit Sunday (1st Day of Pentecost)
 GWV 1138/34:  (1734) - SATB, (fl), ob, hn (2), timp (3), str, bc - Whit Sunday (1st Day of Pentecost)
 GWV 1138/35:  (1735) - SSATB, fl, chal (2)tb, str, bc - Whit Sunday (1st Day of Pentecost)
 GWV 1138/39:  (1739) - SATBB, chal (2)at, fg, str, bc - Whit Sunday (1st Day of Pentecost)
 GWV 1138/40:  (1740) - SATB, chal (3)stb, clar (2), timp (2), vl, str, bc - Whit Sunday (1st Day of Pentecost)
 GWV 1138/41:  (1741) - SATB, ob (2), fg, clar (2), timp (4), str, bc - Whit Sunday (1st Day of Pentecost)
 GWV 1138/42:  (1742) - ATB, ob (2), str, bc - Whit Sunday (1st Day of Pentecost)
 GWV 1138/43:  (1743) - SATB, chal (2)tb, str, bc - Whit Sunday (1st Day of Pentecost)
 GWV 1138/45:  (1745) - ATB, hn (2), clar, timp (2), str, bc - Whit Sunday (1st Day of Pentecost)
 GWV 1138/46:  (1746) - SATB, fl, hn (2), clar (2), timp (4), str, bc - Whit Sunday (1st Day of Pentecost)
 GWV 1138/47:  (1747) - ATB, ob (2), chal (2)tb(/ob (2)), fg, hn (2), timp (4), str, bc - Whit Sunday (1st Day of Pentecost)
 GWV 1138/53:  (1753) - SATB, fl (2), hn (2), timp (4), str, bc - Whit Sunday (1st Day of Pentecost)

GWV 1139

 GWV 1139/11:  (1711) - SB, ob (2), str, bc - Whit Monday (2nd Day of Pentecost)
 GWV 1139/16:  (1716) - SSAB, fl, str, bc - Whit Monday (2nd Day of Pentecost)
 GWV 1139/18:  (1718) - SSATB, fg (2), violetta (2), str, bc - Whit Monday (2nd Day of Pentecost)
 GWV 1139/19:  (1719) - SATB, ob, str, bc - Whit Monday (2nd Day of Pentecost)
 GWV 1139/20:  (1720) - B, fg (2), violetta (2), str, bc - Whit Monday (2nd Day of Pentecost)
 GWV 1139/26:  (1726) - SATB, fl (2), fg, str, bc - Whit Monday (2nd Day of Pentecost)
 GWV 1139/27:  (1727) - SATB, fl (2), ob (2), fg, vl, str, bc - Whit Monday (2nd Day of Pentecost)
 GWV 1139/29:  (1729) - SATB, str, bc - Whit Monday (2nd Day of Pentecost)
 GWV 1139/30:  (1730) - SATB, str, bc - Whit Monday (2nd Day of Pentecost)
 GWV 1139/36:  (1736) - SATB, ob am (2), fg, str, bc - Whit Monday (2nd Day of Pentecost)
 GWV 1139/38:  (1738) - SATB, (fl), fg, vla am, str, bc - Whit Monday (2nd Day of Pentecost)
 GWV 1139/40:  (1740) - SATB, (fl), ob (2), fg, hn (2), tra, timp (4), str, bc - Whit Monday (2nd Day of Pentecost)
 GWV 1139/41:  (1741) - SATB, ob (2), str, bc - Whit Monday (2nd Day of Pentecost)
 GWV 1139/42:  (1742) - ATB, str, bc - Whit Monday (2nd Day of Pentecost)
 GWV 1139/43:  (1743) - SATB, str, bc - Whit Monday (2nd Day of Pentecost)
 GWV 1139/44:  (1744) - SATB, str, bc - Whit Monday (2nd Day of Pentecost)
 GWV 1139/46:  (1746) - SATB, str, bc - Whit Monday (2nd Day of Pentecost)
 GWV 1139/48:  (1748) - ATB, str, bc - Whit Monday (2nd Day of Pentecost)
 GWV 1139/49:  (1749) - SAT, str, bc - Whit Monday (2nd Day of Pentecost)
 GWV 1139/50:  (1750) - SATB, str, bc - Whit Monday (2nd Day of Pentecost)
 GWV 1139/51:  (1751) - SATB, fl (2), hn (2), str, bc - Whit Monday (2nd Day of Pentecost)
 GWV 1139/53:  (1753) - SATB, fl (2), hn (2), clar (2), timp (5), str, bc - Whit Monday (2nd Day of Pentecost)

GWV 1140

 GWV 1140/11:  (1711) - S, ob (2), (fg), vl (2), bc - Whit Tuesday (3rd Day of Pentecost)
 GWV 1140/12:  (1712) - B, vl unis, bc - Whit Tuesday (3rd Day of Pentecost)
 GWV 1140/21:  (1721) - SATB, str, bc - Whit Tuesday (3rd Day of Pentecost)
 GWV 1140/22:  (1722) - SSATB, hn (2), str, bc - Whit Tuesday (3rd Day of Pentecost)
 GWV 1140/23:  (1723) - SATB, str, bc - Whit Tuesday (3rd Day of Pentecost)
 GWV 1140/24:  (1724) - SATB, hn, str, bc - Whit Tuesday (3rd Day of Pentecost)
 GWV 1140/25:  (1725) - SATB, fl, hn (2), vla am, str, bc - Whit Tuesday (3rd Day of Pentecost)
 GWV 1140/28:  (1728) - SATB, str, bc - Whit Tuesday (3rd Day of Pentecost)
 GWV 1140/32:  (1732) - SATB, str, bc - Whit Tuesday (3rd Day of Pentecost)
 GWV 1140/33:  (1733) - SATB, str, bc - Whit Tuesday (3rd Day of Pentecost)
 GWV 1140/34:  (1734) - ATB, fl (2)/ob am (2), str, bc - Whit Tuesday (3rd Day of Pentecost)
 GWV 1140/35:  (1735) - SATB, fl (2), str, bc - Whit Tuesday (3rd Day of Pentecost)
 GWV 1140/39:  (1739) - SATB, str, bc - Whit Tuesday (3rd Day of Pentecost)
 GWV 1140/40:  (1740) - SATB, ob, str, bc - Whit Tuesday (3rd Day of Pentecost)
 GWV 1140/41:  (1741) - SATB, ob, str, bc - Whit Tuesday (3rd Day of Pentecost)
 GWV 1140/42:  (1742) - T, str, bc - Whit Tuesday (3rd Day of Pentecost)
 GWV 1140/43:  (1743) - B, str, bc - Whit Tuesday (3rd Day of Pentecost)
 GWV 1140/45:  (1745) - T, str, bc - Whit Tuesday (3rd Day of Pentecost)
 GWV 1140/46:  (1746) - SATB, str, bc - Whit Tuesday (3rd Day of Pentecost)
 GWV 1140/47:  (1747) - ATB, str, bc - Whit Tuesday (3rd Day of Pentecost)

GWV 1141

 GWV 1141/16:  (1716) - SATB, clar (2), timp (2), str, bc - Trinity Sunday
 GWV 1141/18:  (1718) - SSATB, ob (2), str, bc - Trinity Sunday
 GWV 1141/19:  (1719) - SATB, str, bc - Trinity Sunday
 GWV 1141/20:  (1720) - B, str, bc - Trinity Sunday
 GWV 1141/26:  (1726) - SATB, ob (2), clar (2), timp (2), str, bc - Trinity Sunday
 GWV 1141/27:  (1727) - SATB, fl (2), ob (2), fg, clar (2), timp (2), str, bc - Trinity Sunday
 GWV 1141/29:  (1729) - SATB, str, bc - Trinity Sunday
 GWV 1141/30:  (1730) - SATB, str, bc - Trinity Sunday
 GWV 1141/36:  (1736) - SATB, fg, str, bc - Trinity Sunday
 GWV 1141/38:  (1738) - SATB, fg, str, bc - Trinity Sunday
 GWV 1141/40:  (1740) - SATB, ob/chals, str, bc - Trinity Sunday
 GWV 1141/41:  (1741) - SATB, ob (2), fg, clar (2), timp (4), str, bc - Trinity Sunday
 GWV 1141/42:  (1742) - ATB, str, bc - Trinity Sunday
 GWV 1141/43:  (1743) - SATB, str, bc - Trinity Sunday
 GWV 1141/44:  (1744) - SATB, chal (2)at, fg, hn (2), clar (2), timp (4), str, bc - Trinity Sunday
 GWV 1141/46:  (1746) - SATB, str, bc - Trinity Sunday
 GWV 1141/48:  (1748) - SATB, fl (2), hn (2), timp (4), str, bc - Trinity Sunday
 GWV 1141/49:  (1749) - SATB, fl (2), clar (2), timp (4), str, bc - Trinity Sunday
 GWV 1141/50:  (1750) - SATB, str, bc - Trinity Sunday
 GWV 1141/51:  (1751) - SATB, fl (2), hn (2), str, bc - Trinity Sunday
 GWV 1141/53:  (1753) - ATB, hn (2), timp (5), str, bc - Trinity Sunday

GWV 1142

 GWV 1142/11:  (1711) - S, ob (2), fg, str, bc - 1st Sunday after Trinity
 GWV 1142/12:  (1712) - SS, fl (2), ob (2), str, bc - 1st Sunday after Trinity
 GWV 1142/13:  (1713) - SB, ob (2), vl (2), str, bc - 1st Sunday after Trinity
 GWV 1142/21:  (1721) - SATB, ob (2), str, bc - 1st Sunday after Trinity
 GWV 1142/22:  (1722) - SSATB, ob (2), str, bc - 1st Sunday after Trinity
 GWV 1142/23:  (1723) - AB, str, bc - 1st Sunday after Trinity
 GWV 1142/24:  (1724) - SATB, ob (am), str, bc - 1st Sunday after Trinity
 GWV 1142/25:  (1725) - SATB, fl, str, bc - 1st Sunday after Trinity
 GWV 1142/28:  (1728) - SATB, ob (2), str, bc - 1st Sunday after Trinity
 GWV 1142/30:  (1730) - SATB, str, bc - 1st Sunday after Trinity
 GWV 1142/31:  (1731) - SATB, str, bc - 1st Sunday after Trinity
 GWV 1142/32:  (1732) - SATB, hn (2), tra, str, bc - 1st Sunday after Trinity
 GWV 1142/33:  (1733) - SATB, str, bc - 1st Sunday after Trinity
 GWV 1142/34:  (1734) - SATB, fl (2), ob am, str, bc - 1st Sunday after Trinity
 GWV 1142/35:  (1735) - SATB, str, bc - 1st Sunday after Trinity
 GWV 1142/39:  (1739) - SATB, str, bc - 1st Sunday after Trinity
 GWV 1142/40:  (1740) - SATB, str, bc - 1st Sunday after Trinity
 GWV 1142/41:  (1741) - SATB, str, bc - 1st Sunday after Trinity
 GWV 1142/42:  (1742) - STB, str, bc - 1st Sunday after Trinity
 GWV 1142/43:  (1743) - SATB, str, bc - 1st Sunday after Trinity
 GWV 1142/45:  (1745) - SATB, str, bc - 1st Sunday after Trinity
 GWV 1142/46:  (1746) - SATB, str, bc - 1st Sunday after Trinity
 GWV 1142/47:  (1747) - SAT, str, bc - 1st Sunday after Trinity

GWV 1143

 GWV 1143/11:  (1711) - S, ob (2), str, bc - 2nd Sunday after Trinity
 GWV 1143/12:  (1712) - SS, ob (2), str, bc - 2nd Sunday after Trinity
 GWV 1143/18:  (1718) - SB, str, bc - 2nd Sunday after Trinity
 GWV 1143/19:  (1719) - SATB, str, bc - 2nd Sunday after Trinity
 GWV 1143/20:  (1720) - B, str, bc - 2nd Sunday after Trinity
 GWV 1143/23:  (1723) - AB, str, bc - 2nd Sunday after Trinity
 GWV 1143/27:  (1727) - SATB, str, bc - 2nd Sunday after Trinity
 GWV 1143/29:  (1729) - SATB, str, bc - 2nd Sunday after Trinity
 GWV 1143/34:  (1734) - SATB, (fl/ob), str, bc - 2nd Sunday after Trinity
 GWV 1143/36:  (1736) - SATB, str, bc - 2nd Sunday after Trinity
 GWV 1143/38:  (1738) - SATB, str, bc - 2nd Sunday after Trinity
 GWV 1143/40:  (1740) - SATB, ob (2), fg, vl (2), str, bc - 2nd Sunday after Trinity
 GWV 1143/41:  (1741) - SATB, ob, str, bc - 2nd Sunday after Trinity
 GWV 1143/42:  (1742) - ATB, str, bc - 2nd Sunday after Trinity
 GWV 1143/43:  (1743) - SATB, str, bc - 2nd Sunday after Trinity
 GWV 1143/44:  (1744) - SATB, str, bc - 2nd Sunday after Trinity
 GWV 1143/46:  (1746) - ATB, str, bc - 2nd Sunday after Trinity
 GWV 1143/48:  (1748) - SATB, chal (2)at, fg, str, bc - 2nd Sunday after Trinity
 GWV 1143/51:  (1751) - ATB, fl (2), fg, str, bc - 2nd Sunday after Trinity
 GWV 1143/53:  (1753) - ATB, fl (2), str, bc - 2nd Sunday after Trinity

GWV 1144

 GWV 1144/11:  (1711) - S, ob, str, bc - 3rd Sunday after Trinity
 GWV 1144/12:  (1712) - SS, str, bc - 3rd Sunday after Trinity
 GWV 1144/21:  (1721) - ST, str, bc - 3rd Sunday after Trinity
 GWV 1144/22:  (1722) - SATB, str, bc - 3rd Sunday after Trinity
 GWV 1144/24:  (1724) - SSATB, ob(am) (2), str, bc - 3rd Sunday after Trinity
 GWV 1144/28:  (1728) - SATB, str, bc - 3rd Sunday after Trinity
 GWV 1144/31:  (1731) - SATB, ob am, str, bc - 3rd Sunday after Trinity
 GWV 1144/32:  (1732) - SATB, str, bc - 3rd Sunday after Trinity
 GWV 1144/35:  (1735) - SATB, str, bc - 3rd Sunday after Trinity
 GWV 1144/40:  (1740) - SATB, str, bc - 3rd Sunday after Trinity
 GWV 1144/41:  (1741) - SATB, fg, str, bc - 3rd Sunday after Trinity
 GWV 1144/42:  (1742) - ATB, str, bc - 3rd Sunday after Trinity
 GWV 1144/43:  (1743) - SATB, str, bc - 3rd Sunday after Trinity
 GWV 1144/44:  (1744) - SATB, str, bc - 3rd Sunday after Trinity
 GWV 1144/45:  (1745) - SATB, str, bc - 3rd Sunday after Trinity
 GWV 1144/46:  (1746) - ATB, str, bc - 3rd Sunday after Trinity
 GWV 1144/47:  (1747) - SATB, str, bc - 3rd Sunday after Trinity
 GWV 1144/49:  (1749) - SATB, str, bc - 3rd Sunday after Trinity

GWV 1145

 GWV 1145/10:  (1710) - B, ob (2), str, bc - 4th Sunday after Trinity
 GWV 1145/11:  (1711) - S, str, bc - 4th Sunday after Trinity
 GWV 1145/13:  (1713) - SSATB, ob (2), str, bc - 4th Sunday after Trinity
 GWV 1145/16:  (1716) - S, fl, str, bc - 4th Sunday after Trinity
 GWV 1145/18:  (1718) - SATB, str, bc - 4th Sunday after Trinity
 GWV 1145/20:  (1720) - B, vl (2), str, bc - 4th Sunday after Trinity
 GWV 1145/21:  (1721) - STB, str, bc - 4th Sunday after Trinity
 GWV 1145/23:  (1723) - SATB, ob (2), fg, str, bc - 4th Sunday after Trinity
 GWV 1145/25:  (1725) - SSATTB, fl, vl, str, bc - 4th Sunday after Trinity
 GWV 1145/32:  (1732) - SATB, str, bc - 4th Sunday after Trinity
 GWV 1145/37:  (1737) - SATB, fl (2), str, bc - 4th Sunday after Trinity
 GWV 1145/40:  (1740) - SATB, str, bc - 4th Sunday after Trinity
 GWV 1145/41:  (1741) - SATB, ob, str, bc - 4th Sunday after Trinity
 GWV 1145/42:  (1742) - SATB, str, bc - 4th Sunday after Trinity
 GWV 1145/43:  (1743) - SATB, str, bc - 4th Sunday after Trinity
 GWV 1145/44:  (1744) - SATB, str, bc - 4th Sunday after Trinity
 GWV 1145/45:  (1745) - SATB, str, bc - 4th Sunday after Trinity
 GWV 1145/47:  (1747) - SATB, str, bc - 4th Sunday after Trinity
 GWV 1145/48:  (1748) - SATB, fl (2), fg, str, bc - 4th Sunday after Trinity
 GWV 1145/49:  (1749) - SATB, fl (2), str, bc - 4th Sunday after Trinity
 GWV 1145/53:  (1753) - ATB, str, bc - 4th Sunday after Trinity

GWV 1146

 GWV 1146/10:  (1710) - B, vl, vl unis, bc - 5th Sunday after Trinity
 GWV 1146/11:  (1711) - SB, ob (2), fg, vl solo (2), str, bc - 5th Sunday after Trinity
 GWV 1146/24:  (1724) - SATB, str, bc - 5th Sunday after Trinity
 GWV 1146/28:  (1728) - SATB, ob (2), fg, str, bc - 5th Sunday after Trinity
 GWV 1146/30:  (1730) - SATB, str, bc - 5th Sunday after Trinity
 GWV 1146/31:  (1731) - SATB, fl (2), str, bc - 5th Sunday after Trinity
 GWV 1146/38:  (1738) - SATB, str, bc - 5th Sunday after Trinity
 GWV 1146/40:  (1740) - SATBB, ob (2), chal (2)st, fg, hn (2), vl (2), str, bc - 5th Sunday after Trinity
 GWV 1146/41:  (1741) - SATB, str, bc - 5th Sunday after Trinity
 GWV 1146/42:  (1742) - SATB, str, bc - 5th Sunday after Trinity
 GWV 1146/43:  (1743) - SATB, str, bc - 5th Sunday after Trinity
 GWV 1146/44:  (1744) - SATB, str, bc - 5th Sunday after Trinity
 GWV 1146/46:  (1746) - B, fg, str, bc - 5th Sunday after Trinity
 GWV 1146/47:  (1747) - SATB, str, bc - 5th Sunday after Trinity
 GWV 1146/48:  (1748) - SATB, str, bc - 5th Sunday after Trinity
 GWV 1146/49:  (1749) - SATB, str, bc - 5th Sunday after Trinity

GWV 1147

 GWV 1147/11:  (1711) - S, fl (2), violetta, str (vla (2)), bc - 6th Sunday after Trinity
 GWV 1147/13:  (1713) - S, ob (2), str, bc - 6th Sunday after Trinity
 GWV 1147/19:  (1719) - SATB, str, bc - 6th Sunday after Trinity
 GWV 1147/20:  (1720) - SA, str, bc - 6th Sunday after Trinity
 GWV 1147/22:  (1722) - SATB, ob (2), fg, str, bc - 6th Sunday after Trinity
 GWV 1147/24:  (1724) - SATB, str, bc - 6th Sunday after Trinity
 GWV 1147/28:  (1728) - SATB, str, bc - 6th Sunday after Trinity
 GWV 1147/32:  (1732) - SATB, str, bc - 6th Sunday after Trinity
 GWV 1147/33:  (1733) - SATB, str, bc - 6th Sunday after Trinity
 GWV 1147/37:  (1737) - SATB, str, bc - 6th Sunday after Trinity
 GWV 1147/39:  (1739) - SATB, str, bc - 6th Sunday after Trinity
 GWV 1147/40:  (1740) - SATB, chal (3)stb, fg, vl, str, bc - 6th Sunday after Trinity
 GWV 1147/41:  (1741) - SATB, fl (2), str, bc - 6th Sunday after Trinity
 GWV 1147/42:  (1742) - SATB, ob, fg, str, bc - 6th Sunday after Trinity
 GWV 1147/43:  (1743) - SATB, str, bc - 6th Sunday after Trinity
 GWV 1147/45:  (1745) - SATB, str, bc - 6th Sunday after Trinity
 GWV 1147/47:  (1747) - SATB, str, bc - 6th Sunday after Trinity
 GWV 1147/48:  (1748) - SATB, str, bc - 6th Sunday after Trinity
 GWV 1147/49:  (1749) - SATB, fl (2), str, bc - 6th Sunday after Trinity
 GWV 1147/53:  (1753) - ATB, str, bc - 6th Sunday after Trinity

GWV 1148

 GWV 1148/09:  (1709) - SB, vl (2), bc - 7th Sunday after Trinity
 GWV 1148/11:  (1711) - SATB, ob (2), fg, str, bc - 7th Sunday after Trinity
 GWV 1148/12:  (1712) - SSATB, ob (2), fg, str, bc - 7th Sunday after Trinity
 GWV 1148/20:  (1720) - SA, vl unis, bc - 7th Sunday after Trinity
 GWV 1148/24:  (1724) - SAT, str, bc - 7th Sunday after Trinity
 GWV 1148/25:  (1725) - SSATB, ob, str, bc - 7th Sunday after Trinity
 GWV 1148/26:  (1726) - SATB, str, bc - 7th Sunday after Trinity
 GWV 1148/27:  (1727) - SATB, str, bc - 7th Sunday after Trinity
 GWV 1148/40:  (1740) - SATB, ob (2), fg, vl, str, bc - 7th Sunday after Trinity
 GWV 1148/42:  (1742) - SATB, str, bc - 7th Sunday after Trinity
 GWV 1148/44:  (1744) - SATB, str, bc - 7th Sunday after Trinity
 GWV 1148/45:  (1745) - SATB, str, bc - 7th Sunday after Trinity
 GWV 1148/46:  (1746) - T, str, bc - 7th Sunday after Trinity
 GWV 1148/47:  (1747) - SATB, str, bc - 7th Sunday after Trinity
 GWV 1148/48:  (1748) - SATB, hn (2), (timp (4)), str, bc - 7th Sunday after Trinity
 GWV 1148/49:  (1749) - SATB, str, bc - 7th Sunday after Trinity
 GWV 1148/51:  (1751) - ATB, str, bc - 7th Sunday after Trinity
 GWV 1148/52:  (1752) - SATB, fl (2), str, bc - 7th Sunday after Trinity
 GWV 1148/53:  (1753) - ATB, fl, vl, str, bc - 7th Sunday after Trinity

GWV 1149

 GWV 1149/11:  (1711) - S, ob (2), str, bc - 8th Sunday after Trinity
 GWV 1149/13:  (1713) - B, ob, str, bc - 8th Sunday after Trinity
 GWV 1149/19:  (1719) - B, str, bc - 8th Sunday after Trinity
 GWV 1149/20:  (1720) - SAT, str, bc - 8th Sunday after Trinity
 GWV 1149/22:  (1722) - SSATB, str, bc - 8th Sunday after Trinity
 GWV 1149/23:  (1723) - SSATB, str, bc - 8th Sunday after Trinity
 GWV 1149/24:  (1724) - ATTB, str, bc - 8th Sunday after Trinity
 GWV 1149/28:  (1728) - SATB, str, bc - 8th Sunday after Trinity
 GWV 1149/31:  (1731) - SATB, fl (2), str, bc - 8th Sunday after Trinity
 GWV 1149/32:  (1732) - SATB, str, bc - 8th Sunday after Trinity
 GWV 1149/34:  (1734) - SATB, str, bc - 8th Sunday after Trinity
 GWV 1149/37:  (1737) - SATB, str, bc - 8th Sunday after Trinity
 GWV 1149/40:  (1740) - SATB, str, bc - 8th Sunday after Trinity
 GWV 1149/44:  (1744) - SATB, fl, str, bc - 8th Sunday after Trinity
 GWV 1149/45:  (1745) - SATB, str, bc - 8th Sunday after Trinity
 GWV 1149/47:  (1747) - SATB, str, bc - 8th Sunday after Trinity
 GWV 1149/48:  (1748) - SATB, str, bc - 8th Sunday after Trinity
 GWV 1149/52:  (1752) - SATB, str, bc - 8th Sunday after Trinity
 GWV 1149/53:  (1753) - ATB, str, bc - 8th Sunday after Trinity

GWV 1150

 GWV 1150/09:  (1709) - SATB, str, bc - 9th Sunday after Trinity
 GWV 1150/12:  (1712) - B, str, bc - 9th Sunday after Trinity
 GWV 1150/16:  (1716) - SATB, ob (2), fg, str, bc - 9th Sunday after Trinity
 GWV 1150/21:  (1721) - STB, str, bc - 9th Sunday after Trinity
 GWV 1150/23:  (1723) - SATB, str, bc - 9th Sunday after Trinity
 GWV 1150/25:  (1725) - SATB, str, bc - 9th Sunday after Trinity
 GWV 1150/26:  (1726) - SATB, fl, str, bc - 9th Sunday after Trinity
 GWV 1150/27:  (1727) - SATB, str, bc - 9th Sunday after Trinity
 GWV 1150/29:  (1729) - SATB, fl, str, bc - 9th Sunday after Trinity
 GWV 1150/30:  (1730) - SATB, fl, str, bc - 9th Sunday after Trinity
 GWV 1150/35:  (1735) - SATB, str, bc - 9th Sunday after Trinity
 GWV 1150/40:  (1740) - SATB, str, bc - 9th Sunday after Trinity
 GWV 1150/44:  (1744) - SATB, str, bc - 9th Sunday after Trinity
 GWV 1150/45:  (1745) - SATB, str, bc - 9th Sunday after Trinity
 GWV 1150/46:  (1746) - ATB, str, bc - 9th Sunday after Trinity
 GWV 1150/47:  (1747) - SATB, str, bc - 9th Sunday after Trinity
 GWV 1150/49:  (1749) - ATB, fl (2), str, bc - 9th Sunday after Trinity
 GWV 1150/51:  (1751) - ATB, str, bc - 9th Sunday after Trinity
 GWV 1150/52:  (1752) - SATB, hn (2), str, bc - 9th Sunday after Trinity
 GWV 1150/53a:  (1753) - ATB, str, bc - 9th Sunday after Trinity
 GWV 1150/53b:  (1753) - ATB, str, bc - 9th Sunday after Trinity

GWV 1151

 GWV 1151/13:  (1713) - SSATB, ob (2), str, bc - 10th Sunday after Trinity
 GWV 1151/14:  (1714) - SATB, ob, vla am, vc, str, bc - 10th Sunday after Trinity
 GWV 1151/19:  (1719) - SATB, str, bc - 10th Sunday after Trinity
 GWV 1151/21:  (1721) - SSTB, (fl (2)), ob (2), str, bc - 10th Sunday after Trinity
 GWV 1151/22:  (1722) - S, str, bc - 10th Sunday after Trinity
 GWV 1151/24:  (1724) - SATB, str, bc - 10th Sunday after Trinity
 GWV 1151/26:  (1726) - SATB, org, str, bc - 10th Sunday after Trinity
 GWV 1151/28a:  (1728) - SATB, fl, ob (2), str, bc - 10th Sunday after Trinity
 GWV 1151/28b:  (1728) - SATB, str, bc - 10th Sunday after Trinity
 GWV 1151/29:  (1729) - SATB, str, bc - 10th Sunday after Trinity
 GWV 1151/31:  (1731) - SATB, str, bc - 10th Sunday after Trinity
 GWV 1151/32:  (1732) - SATB, str, bc - 10th Sunday after Trinity
 GWV 1151/33:  (1733) - SATB, str, bc - 10th Sunday after Trinity
 GWV 1151/34:  (1734) - SATB, fl/ob, str, bc - 10th Sunday after Trinity
 GWV 1151/35:  (1735) - SATB, str, bc - 10th Sunday after Trinity
 GWV 1151/37:  (1737) - SATB, ob (2)/chal (2)tb, fg, str, bc - 10th Sunday after Trinity
 GWV 1151/40:  (1740) - SATB, str, bc - 10th Sunday after Trinity
 GWV 1151/44:  (1744) - SATB, str, bc - 10th Sunday after Trinity
 GWV 1151/45:  (1745) - SATB, str, bc - 10th Sunday after Trinity
 GWV 1151/46:  (1746) - SATB, (ob), str, bc - 10th Sunday after Trinity
 GWV 1151/47:  (1747) - SATB, str, bc - 10th Sunday after Trinity
 GWV 1151/52:  (1752) - SATB, str, bc - 10th Sunday after Trinity
 GWV 1151/53:  (1753) - SATB, fl (2), str, bc - 10th Sunday after Trinity

GWV 1152

 GWV 1152/09:  (1709) - SATB, str, bc - 11th Sunday after Trinity
 GWV 1152/12a:  (1712) - SATB, ob, vl, str, bc - 11th Sunday after Trinity
 GWV 1152/12b:  (1712) - S, ob (2), str, bc - 11th Sunday after Trinity
 GWV 1152/16:  (1716) - B, fl, ob, str, bc - 11th Sunday after Trinity
 GWV 1152/18:  (1718) - SSATB, ob, str, bc - 11th Sunday after Trinity
 GWV 1152/20:  (1720) - B, vl unis, bc - 11th Sunday after Trinity
 GWV 1152/21:  (1721) - ST, (fl/violetta), str, bc - 11th Sunday after Trinity
 GWV 1152/23:  (1723) - SATB, str, bc - 11th Sunday after Trinity
 GWV 1152/25:  (1725) - SSAT, str, bc - 11th Sunday after Trinity
 GWV 1152/26:  (1726) - SATB, str, bc - 11th Sunday after Trinity
 GWV 1152/27:  (1727) - SATB, str, bc - 11th Sunday after Trinity
 GWV 1152/30:  (1730) - SATB, str, bc - 11th Sunday after Trinity
 GWV 1152/35:  (1735) - SATB, str, bc - 11th Sunday after Trinity
 GWV 1152/36:  (1736) - SATB, str, bc - 11th Sunday after Trinity
 GWV 1152/40:  (1740) - ATB, str, bc - 11th Sunday after Trinity
 GWV 1152/43:  (1743) - SATB, fg, str, bc - 11th Sunday after Trinity
 GWV 1152/44:  (1744) - SATB, str, bc - 11th Sunday after Trinity
 GWV 1152/45:  (1745) - SATB, str, bc - 11th Sunday after Trinity
 GWV 1152/46:  (1746) - B, str, bc - 11th Sunday after Trinity
 GWV 1152/49:  (1749) - SATB, str, bc - 11th Sunday after Trinity
 GWV 1152/51:  (1751) - ATB, str, bc - 11th Sunday after Trinity
 GWV 1152/53a:  (1753) - SATB, hn (2), str, bc - 11th Sunday after Trinity
 GWV 1152/53b:  (1753) - SATB, fl (2), hn (2), str, bc - 11th Sunday after Trinity

GWV 1153

 GWV 1153/09a:  (1709) - SATB, str (vla (2)), bc - 12th Sunday after Trinity
 GWV 1153/09b:  (1709) - SB, str, bc - 12th Sunday after Trinity
 GWV 1153/13:  (1713) - SATB, ob (2), str, bc - 12th Sunday after Trinity
 GWV 1153/14:  (1714) - SSATB, ob (2), str, bc - 12th Sunday after Trinity
 GWV 1153/16:  (1716) - SATB, ob (2), str, bc - 12th Sunday after Trinity
 GWV 1153/19:  (1719) - SSATB, str, bc - 12th Sunday after Trinity
 GWV 1153/21:  (1721) - SSTB, str, bc - 12th Sunday after Trinity
 GWV 1153/23:  (1723) - SSATB, org, str, bc - 12th Sunday after Trinity
 GWV 1153/24:  (1724) - SATB, str, bc - 12th Sunday after Trinity
 GWV 1153/25:  (1725) - SSAT, str, bc - 12th Sunday after Trinity
 GWV 1153/27:  (1727) - SATB, str, bc - 12th Sunday after Trinity
 GWV 1153/29:  (1729) - SATB, fg, str, bc - 12th Sunday after Trinity
 GWV 1153/31:  (1731) - SATB, str, bc - 12th Sunday after Trinity
 GWV 1153/32:  (1732) - SATB, str, bc - 12th Sunday after Trinity
 GWV 1153/33:  (1733) - ATB, str, bc - 12th Sunday after Trinity
 GWV 1153/34:  (1734) - SATB, str, bc - 12th Sunday after Trinity
 GWV 1153/35:  (1735) - SATB, fl/ob (2), str, bc - 12th Sunday after Trinity
 GWV 1153/40:  (1740) - ATB, str, bc - 12th Sunday after Trinity
 GWV 1153/41:  (1741) - ATB, ob (2), str, bc - 12th Sunday after Trinity
 GWV 1153/43:  (1743) - SATB, str, bc - 12th Sunday after Trinity
 GWV 1153/44:  (1744) - SATB, str, bc - 12th Sunday after Trinity
 GWV 1153/45:  (1745) - SATB, (ob), str, bc - 12th Sunday after Trinity
 GWV 1153/46:  (1746) - ATB, str, bc - 12th Sunday after Trinity
 GWV 1153/47:  (1747) - SATB, str, bc - 12th Sunday after Trinity
 GWV 1153/53:  (1753) - SATB, fl (2), hn (2), str, bc - 12th Sunday after Trinity

GWV 1154

 GWV 1154/09a:  (1709) - SATB, vc, str, bc - 13th Sunday after Trinity
 GWV 1154/09b:  (1709) - SATB, str, bc - 13th Sunday after Trinity
 GWV 1154/12a:  (1712) - S, ob (2), fg, str, bc - 13th Sunday after Trinity
 GWV 1154/12b:  (1712) - B, (fg), vl, str, bc - 13th Sunday after Trinity
 GWV 1154/20:  (1720) - B, str, bc - 13th Sunday after Trinity
 GWV 1154/23:  (1723) - SATB, fg, str, bc - 13th Sunday after Trinity
 GWV 1154/25:  (1725) - SSAT, ob (2), fg, str, bc - 13th Sunday after Trinity
 GWV 1154/26:  (1726) - SATB, rec, fl (2), str, bc - 13th Sunday after Trinity
 GWV 1154/27:  (1727) - SAT, fl/ob, str, bc - 13th Sunday after Trinity
 GWV 1154/30:  (1730) - SAT(B), str, bc - 13th Sunday after Trinity
 GWV 1154/36:  (1736) - SATB, fl, chal (2)tb, fg, str, bc - 13th Sunday after Trinity
 GWV 1154/38:  (1738) - SATB, str, bc - 13th Sunday after Trinity
 GWV 1154/39:  (1739) - SATB, chalb/fg, str, bc - 13th Sunday after Trinity
 GWV 1154/40:  (1740) - ATB, str, bc - 13th Sunday after Trinity
 GWV 1154/41:  (1741) - ATB, ob (2), fg, vl, str, bc - 13th Sunday after Trinity
 GWV 1154/42:  (1742) - ATB, str, bc - 13th Sunday after Trinity
 GWV 1154/43:  (1743) - SATB, str, bc - 13th Sunday after Trinity
 GWV 1154/46:  (1746) - ATB, str, bc - 13th Sunday after Trinity
 GWV 1154/48:  (1748) - SATB, hn (2), str, bc - 13th Sunday after Trinity
 GWV 1154/49:  (1749) - SATB, str, bc - 13th Sunday after Trinity
 GWV 1154/53:  (1753) - SATB, fl (2), hn (2), str, bc - 13th Sunday after Trinity

GWV 1155

 GWV 1155/09a:  (1709) - SB, (ob), str (vla (2)), bc - 14th Sunday after Trinity
 GWV 1155/09b:  (1709) - S, (ob), str (vla (2)), bc - 14th Sunday after Trinity
 GWV 1155/13:  (1713) - SSSTB, ob (2), str, bc - 14th Sunday after Trinity
 GWV 1155/16:  (1716) - S, fl (2), str, bc - 14th Sunday after Trinity
 GWV 1155/19:  (1719) - SSATB, str, bc - 14th Sunday after Trinity
 GWV 1155/22:  (1722) - SATB, ob, str, bc - 14th Sunday after Trinity
 GWV 1155/24:  (1724) - SATB, org (?), str, bc - 14th Sunday after Trinity
 GWV 1155/25:  (1725) - SATB, ob (2), str, bc - 14th Sunday after Trinity
 GWV 1155/28:  (1728) - SATB, str, bc - 14th Sunday after Trinity
 GWV 1155/29:  (1729) - SATB, str, bc - 14th Sunday after Trinity
 GWV 1155/31:  (1731) - SATB, fl (2), str, bc - 14th Sunday after Trinity
 GWV 1155/32:  (1732) - SATB, str, bc - 14th Sunday after Trinity
 GWV 1155/33:  (1733) - SATB, str, bc - 14th Sunday after Trinity
 GWV 1155/34:  (1734) - SATB, str, bc - 14th Sunday after Trinity
 GWV 1155/35:  (1735) - SATB, str, bc - 14th Sunday after Trinity
 GWV 1155/36:  (1736) - SAT, ob (2), fg, str, bc - 14th Sunday after Trinity
 GWV 1155/37:  (1737) - SATB, str, bc - 14th Sunday after Trinity
 GWV 1155/39:  (1739) - SATB, str, bc - 14th Sunday after Trinity
 GWV 1155/40:  (1740) - SATB, str, bc - 14th Sunday after Trinity
 GWV 1155/41:  (1741) - ATB, ob (2), fg, str, bc - 14th Sunday after Trinity
 GWV 1155/42:  (1742) - SATB, ob, str, bc - 14th Sunday after Trinity
 GWV 1155/43:  (1743) - SATB, str, bc - 14th Sunday after Trinity
 GWV 1155/45:  (1745) - SATB, str, bc - 14th Sunday after Trinity

GWV 1156

 GWV 1156/09:  (1709) - SATB, str, bc - 15th Sunday after Trinity
 GWV 1156/23:  (1723) - SATB, (fl(2)), str, bc - 15th Sunday after Trinity
 GWV 1156/26:  (1726) - SATB, fl (2), fg, str, bc - 15th Sunday after Trinity
 GWV 1156/27:  (1727) - SAT, str, bc - 15th Sunday after Trinity
 GWV 1156/38:  (1738) - SATB, chal (3)atb, str, bc - 15th Sunday after Trinity
 GWV 1156/39:  (1739) - SATB, str, bc - 15th Sunday after Trinity
 GWV 1156/40:  (1740) - SATB, ob (2), str, bc - 15th Sunday after Trinity
 GWV 1156/41:  (1741) - SATB, str, bc - 15th Sunday after Trinity
 GWV 1156/42:  (1742) - ATB, str, bc - 15th Sunday after Trinity
 GWV 1156/43:  (1743) - SATB, str, bc - 15th Sunday after Trinity
 GWV 1156/46:  (1746) - SATB, str, bc - 15th Sunday after Trinity
 GWV 1156/47:  (1747) - SAB, str, bc - 15th Sunday after Trinity
 GWV 1156/48:  (1748) - SATB, (fl (2)), hn (2), str, bc - 15th Sunday after Trinity
 GWV 1156/49:  (1749) - SATB, fl (2), hn (2), str, bc - 15th Sunday after Trinity
 GWV 1156/53:  (1753) - SATB, fl (2), str, bc - 15th Sunday after Trinity

GWV 1157

 GWV 1157/09a:  (1709) - SATB, str, bc - 16th Sunday after Trinity
 GWV 1157/09b:  (1709) - SATB, str, bc - 16th Sunday after Trinity
 GWV 1157/13:  (1713) - S, ob (2), org, str, bc - 16th Sunday after Trinity
 GWV 1157/16:  (1716) - SSATB, str, bc - 16th Sunday after Trinity
 GWV 1157/21:  (1721) - SATB, ob, str, bc - 16th Sunday after Trinity
 GWV 1157/24:  (1724) - SATB, ob am, str, bc - 16th Sunday after Trinity
 GWV 1157/25:  (1725) - SSATB, fl (2), ob (2), vla am, str, bc - 16th Sunday after Trinity
 GWV 1157/27:  (1727) - SAT, str, bc - 16th Sunday after Trinity
 GWV 1157/28:  (1728) - SATB, ob (2), str, bc - 16th Sunday after Trinity
 GWV 1157/29:  (1729) - SAT(B), str, bc - 16th Sunday after Trinity
 GWV 1157/31:  (1731) - SATB, str, bc - 16th Sunday after Trinity
 GWV 1157/32:  (1732) - SATB, str, bc - 16th Sunday after Trinity
 GWV 1157/33:  (1733) - SATB, fl, str, bc - 16th Sunday after Trinity
 GWV 1157/34:  (1734) - SATB, str, bc - 16th Sunday after Trinity
 GWV 1157/35:  (1735) - SATB, str, bc - 16th Sunday after Trinity
 GWV 1157/37:  (1737) - SATB, chal (2)tb, str, bc - 16th Sunday after Trinity
 GWV 1157/39:  (1739) - SATB, str, bc - 16th Sunday after Trinity
 GWV 1157/40:  (1740) - SATB, ob (2), chals, fg, vl, vla (2), str, bc - 16th Sunday after Trinity
 GWV 1157/41:  (1741) - SATB, ob, vl (2), str, bc - 16th Sunday after Trinity
 GWV 1157/42:  (1742) - ATB, ob (2), fg, str, bc - 16th Sunday after Trinity
 GWV 1157/43:  (1743) - SATB, str, bc - 16th Sunday after Trinity
 GWV 1157/45:  (1745) - SATB, str, bc - 16th Sunday after Trinity
 GWV 1157/47:  (1747) - SAB, str, bc - 16th Sunday after Trinity

GWV 1158

 GWV 1158/12:  (1712) - S, fg, vl (2), bc - 17th Sunday after Trinity
 GWV 1158/16:  (1716) - SSATB, str, bc - 17th Sunday after Trinity
 GWV 1158/19:  (1719) - B, vl (2), bc - 17th Sunday after Trinity
 GWV 1158/26:  (1726) - SATB, str, bc - 17th Sunday after Trinity
 GWV 1158/27:  (1727) - SAT, str, bc - 17th Sunday after Trinity
 GWV 1158/33:  (1733) - SATB, fl, str, bc - 17th Sunday after Trinity
 GWV 1158/36:  (1736) - SATB, fl (2), ob (2), fg (2), str, bc - 17th Sunday after Trinity
 GWV 1158/40:  (1740) - SATB, ob (2), str, bc - 17th Sunday after Trinity
 GWV 1158/41:  (1741) - SATB, str, bc - 17th Sunday after Trinity
 GWV 1158/42:  (1742) - SATB, ob, str, bc - 17th Sunday after Trinity
 GWV 1158/43:  (1743) - SATB, str, bc - 17th Sunday after Trinity
 GWV 1158/44:  (1744) - SATB, str, bc - 17th Sunday after Trinity
 GWV 1158/45:  (1745) - SAB, str, bc - 17th Sunday after Trinity
 GWV 1158/46:  (1746) - SATB, str, bc - 17th Sunday after Trinity
 GWV 1158/48:  (1748) - SATB, str, bc - 17th Sunday after Trinity
 GWV 1158/49:  (1749) - SATB, fl (2), hn (2), str, bc - 17th Sunday after Trinity
 GWV 1158/53:  (1753) - SATB, str, bc - 17th Sunday after Trinity

GWV 1159

 GWV 1159/12a:  (1712) - SB, ob (2), str, bc - 18th Sunday after Trinity
 GWV 1159/12b:  (1712) - B, ob, str, bc - 18th Sunday after Trinity
 GWV 1159/13:  (1713) - SATB, ob (2), str, bc - 18th Sunday after Trinity
 GWV 1159/19:  (1719) - SATB, str, bc - 18th Sunday after Trinity
 GWV 1159/23:  (1723) - SATB, ob (2), str, bc - 18th Sunday after Trinity
 GWV 1159/24:  (1724) - SATB, fl, vl, str, bc - 18th Sunday after Trinity
 GWV 1159/29:  (1729) - SATB, fl, fg, str, bc - 18th Sunday after Trinity
 GWV 1159/31:  (1731) - SATB, str, bc - 18th Sunday after Trinity
 GWV 1159/32:  (1732) - SATB, str, bc - 18th Sunday after Trinity
 GWV 1159/33:  (1733) - SATB, str, bc - 18th Sunday after Trinity
 GWV 1159/34:  (1734) - SATB, str, bc - 18th Sunday after Trinity
 GWV 1159/35:  (1735) - SATB, str, bc - 18th Sunday after Trinity
 GWV 1159/37:  (1737) - SATB, str, bc - 18th Sunday after Trinity
 GWV 1159/40:  (1740) - SATB, (fl), ob (2), fg, str, bc - 18th Sunday after Trinity
 GWV 1159/41:  (1741) - SATB, str, bc - 18th Sunday after Trinity
 GWV 1159/42:  (1742) - SATB, str, bc - 18th Sunday after Trinity
 GWV 1159/43:  (1743) - SATB, str, bc - 18th Sunday after Trinity
 GWV 1159/44:  (1744) - SATB, str, bc - 18th Sunday after Trinity
 GWV 1159/45:  (1745) - SATB, str, bc - 18th Sunday after Trinity
 GWV 1159/47:  (1747) - SAB, fl (2), hn (2), str, bc - 18th Sunday after Trinity

GWV 1160

 GWV 1160/12a:  (1712) - SB, ob (2), str, bc - 19th Sunday after Trinity
 GWV 1160/12b:  (1712) - B, ob (2), str, bc - 19th Sunday after Trinity
 GWV 1160/21:  (1721) - SSATB, ob (2), str, bc - 19th Sunday after Trinity
 GWV 1160/26:  (1726) - SATB, fl (2), str, bc - 19th Sunday after Trinity
 GWV 1160/28:  (1728) - SATB, str, bc - 19th Sunday after Trinity
 GWV 1160/33:  (1733) - SATB, str, bc - 19th Sunday after Trinity
 GWV 1160/36:  (1736) - SATB, (fl/ob), fg, str, bc - 19th Sunday after Trinity
 GWV 1160/38:  (1738) - SATB, str, bc - 19th Sunday after Trinity
 GWV 1160/40:  (1740) - SATB, str, bc - 19th Sunday after Trinity
 GWV 1160/41:  (1741) - SATB, str, bc - 19th Sunday after Trinity
 GWV 1160/42:  (1742) - SATB, ob, str, bc - 19th Sunday after Trinity
 GWV 1160/43:  (1743) - SATB, str, bc - 19th Sunday after Trinity
 GWV 1160/44:  (1744) - SATB, fg, str, bc - 19th Sunday after Trinity
 GWV 1160/46:  (1746) - SATB, str, bc - 19th Sunday after Trinity
 GWV 1160/48:  (1748) - SATB, str, bc - 19th Sunday after Trinity
 GWV 1160/49:  (1749) - SATB, str, bc - 19th Sunday after Trinity
 GWV 1160/53:  (1753) - SATB, fg, str, bc - 19th Sunday after Trinity

GWV 1161

 GWV 1161/13:  (1713) - SB, ob (2), str, bc - 20th Sunday after Trinity
 GWV 1161/16:  (1716) - SATBB, ob (2), str, bc - 20th Sunday after Trinity
 GWV 1161/19:  (1719) - SATB, str, bc - 20th Sunday after Trinity
 GWV 1161/21:  (1721) - SSATB, ob, str, bc - 20th Sunday after Trinity
 GWV 1161/22:  (1722) - B, str, bc - 20th Sunday after Trinity
 GWV 1161/23:  (1723) - SATB, str, bc - 20th Sunday after Trinity
 GWV 1161/25:  (1725) - SSATB, ob (2), str, bc - 20th Sunday after Trinity
 GWV 1161/27:  (1727) - SAT, fl (2), ob (2), fg, str, bc - 20th Sunday after Trinity
 GWV 1161/29:  (1729) - SATB, str, bc - 20th Sunday after Trinity
 GWV 1161/31:  (1731) - SATB, str, bc - 20th Sunday after Trinity
 GWV 1161/32:  (1732) - SATB, str, bc - 20th Sunday after Trinity
 GWV 1161/33:  (1733) - SATBB, str, bc - 20th Sunday after Trinity
 GWV 1161/34:  (1734) - SATB, ob am (fl), vl unis, vla, bc - 20th Sunday after Trinity
 GWV 1161/35:  (1735) - SATB, str, bc - 20th Sunday after Trinity
 GWV 1161/37:  (1737) - SAT, fg, str, bc - 20th Sunday after Trinity
 GWV 1161/39:  (1739) - SATB, str, bc - 20th Sunday after Trinity
 GWV 1161/40:  (1740) - SATB, str, bc - 20th Sunday after Trinity
 GWV 1161/41:  (1741) - SATB, str, bc - 20th Sunday after Trinity
 GWV 1161/42:  (1742) - SATB, str, bc - 20th Sunday after Trinity
 GWV 1161/43:  (1743) - SATB, str, bc - 20th Sunday after Trinity
 GWV 1161/45:  (1745) - SATB, str, bc - 20th Sunday after Trinity
 GWV 1161/47:  (1747) - SAT, str, bc - 20th Sunday after Trinity

GWV 1162

 GWV 1162/09:  (1709) - SB, ob (2), (fg), str, bc - 21st Sunday after Trinity
 GWV 1162/12:  (1712) - S, ob (2), str, bc - 21st Sunday after Trinity
 GWV 1162/20:  (1720) - SSTB, str, bc - 21st Sunday after Trinity
 GWV 1162/26:  (1726) - B, fl (2), str, bc - 21st Sunday after Trinity
 GWV 1162/27:  (1727) - SAT, str, bc - 21st Sunday after Trinity
 GWV 1162/30:  (1730) - SATB, str, bc - 21st Sunday after Trinity
 GWV 1162/36:  (1736) - SATB, str, bc - 21st Sunday after Trinity
 GWV 1162/38:  (1738) - SATB, chal (3)atb, str, bc - 21st Sunday after Trinity
 GWV 1162/39:  (1739) - SATTB, ob, fg, str, bc - 21st Sunday after Trinity
 GWV 1162/40:  (1740) - SATB, str, bc - 21st Sunday after Trinity
 GWV 1162/41:  (1741) - SATB, str, bc - 21st Sunday after Trinity
 GWV 1162/42a:  (1742) - SATB, str, bc - 21st Sunday after Trinity
 GWV 1162/42b:  (1742) - SATB, ob, str, bc - 21st Sunday after Trinity
 GWV 1162/43:  (1743) - SATB, str, bc - 21st Sunday after Trinity
 GWV 1162/46:  (1746) - SATB, str, bc - 21st Sunday after Trinity
 GWV 1162/48:  (1748) - SATB, str, bc - 21st Sunday after Trinity
 GWV 1162/49:  (1749) - SATB, fl (2), str, bc - 21st Sunday after Trinity
 GWV 1162/50:  (1750) - SATB, ob, hn (2), str, bc - 21st Sunday after Trinity
 GWV 1162/51:  (1751) - SATB, str, bc - 21st Sunday after Trinity
 GWV 1162/53:  (1753) - SATB, fl (2), chal (2)tb, fg (2), hn (2), str, bc - 21st Sunday after Trinity

GWV 1163

 GWV 1163/09:  (1709) - SATB, ob (2), fg, str, bc - 22nd Sunday after Trinity
 GWV 1163/13:  (1713) - ATB, ob (2), str, bc - 22nd Sunday after Trinity
 GWV 1163/14:  (1714) - SSATB, ob (2), str, bc - 22nd Sunday after Trinity
 GWV 1163/16:  (1716) - SATB, str, bc - 22nd Sunday after Trinity
 GWV 1163/19:  (1719) - SATB, str, bc - 22nd Sunday after Trinity
 GWV 1163/20:  (1720) - S, str, bc - 22nd Sunday after Trinity
 GWV 1163/21:  (1721) - SATB, (fg), str, bc - 22nd Sunday after Trinity
 GWV 1163/22:  (1722) - B, ob (2), str, bc - 22nd Sunday after Trinity
 GWV 1163/23:  (1723) - SATB, vla am?, str, bc - 22nd Sunday after Trinity
 GWV 1163/24:  (1724) - SATB, fl, str, bc - 22nd Sunday after Trinity
 GWV 1163/25:  (1725) - SATB, fl (2), ob (2), fg, str, bc - 22nd Sunday after Trinity
 GWV 1163/27:  (1727) - SAT, str, bc - 22nd Sunday after Trinity
 GWV 1163/28:  (1728) - SATB, str, bc - 22nd Sunday after Trinity
 GWV 1163/31:  (1731) - SATB, str, bc - 22nd Sunday after Trinity
 GWV 1163/32:  (1732) - SATB, str, bc - 22nd Sunday after Trinity
 GWV 1163/33:  (1733) - SATB, fl, str, bc - 22nd Sunday after Trinity
 GWV 1163/34:  (1734) - SATBB, ob (2), chalb, str, bc - 22nd Sunday after Trinity
 GWV 1163/35:  (1735) - SATB, vla, str, bc - 22nd Sunday after Trinity
 GWV 1163/37:  (1737) - SATB, fl, ob (2), chal (2)tb, fg, str, bc - 22nd Sunday after Trinity
 GWV 1163/39:  (1739) - SATB, ob am (2), str, bc - 22nd Sunday after Trinity
 GWV 1163/40:  (1740) - SATB, str, bc - 22nd Sunday after Trinity
 GWV 1163/41:  (1741) - SATB, str, bc - 22nd Sunday after Trinity
 GWV 1163/43:  (1743) - SATB, str, bc - 22nd Sunday after Trinity
 GWV 1163/45:  (1745) - SATB, str, bc - 22nd Sunday after Trinity
 GWV 1163/47:  (1747) - SAT, str, bc - 22nd Sunday after Trinity
 GWV 1163/53:  (1753) - SATB, str, bc - 22nd Sunday after Trinity

GWV 1164

 GWV 1164/12:  (1712) - S, ob (2), bc - 23rd Sunday after Trinity
 GWV 1164/20:  (1720) - B, str, bc - 23rd Sunday after Trinity
 GWV 1164/26:  (1726) - SATB, str, bc - 23rd Sunday after Trinity
 GWV 1164/27:  (1727) - SAT, str, bc - 23rd Sunday after Trinity
 GWV 1164/38:  (1738) - SATB, ob (3), fg, str, bc - 23rd Sunday after Trinity
 GWV 1164/39:  (1739) - SATB, str, bc - 23rd Sunday after Trinity
 GWV 1164/40:  (1740) - SATB, str, bc - 23rd Sunday after Trinity
 GWV 1164/41:  (1741) - SATB, ob, str, bc - 23rd Sunday after Trinity
 GWV 1164/43:  (1743) - SATB, str, bc - 23rd Sunday after Trinity
 GWV 1164/46:  (1746) - SATB, str, bc - 23rd Sunday after Trinity
 GWV 1164/47:  (1747) - SATB, fl (2), str, bc - 23rd Sunday after Trinity
 GWV 1164/48:  (1748) - SATB, chal (2)ab, fg (2), hn (2), str, bc - 23rd Sunday after Trinity
 GWV 1164/50:  (1750) - SATB, hn (2), str, bc - 23rd Sunday after Trinity
 GWV 1164/51:  (1751) - SATB, hn (2), str, bc - 23rd Sunday after Trinity
 GWV 1164/53a:  (1753) - SATB, hn (2), str, bc - 23rd Sunday after Trinity
 GWV 1164/53b:  (1753) - SATB, ob, hn (2), str, bc - 23rd Sunday after Trinity

GWV 1165

 GWV 1165/09:  (1709) - S, fg, str, bc - 24th Sunday after Trinity
 GWV 1165/13:  (1713) - SATB, ob, str, bc - 24th Sunday after Trinity
 GWV 1165/16:  (1716) - SATB, ob (2), str, bc - 24th Sunday after Trinity
 GWV 1165/19:  (1719) - SATB, str, bc - 24th Sunday after Trinity
 GWV 1165/21:  (1721) - SSATB, (fl (2)), ob (2), hn (2), violetta (2), str, bc - 24th Sunday after Trinity
 GWV 1165/22:  (1722) - SSATB, ob (2), str, bc - 24th Sunday after Trinity
 GWV 1165/23:  (1723) - SATB, str, bc - 24th Sunday after Trinity
 GWV 1165/24:  (1724) - SSATB, str, bc - 24th Sunday after Trinity
 GWV 1165/25:  (1725) - SATB, ob (3), fg, str, bc - 24th Sunday after Trinity
 GWV 1165/27:  (1727) - SAT, str, bc - 24th Sunday after Trinity
 GWV 1165/28:  (1728) - ATB, org, str, bc - 24th Sunday after Trinity
 GWV 1165/30:  (1730) - SATB, str, bc - 24th Sunday after Trinity
 GWV 1165/31:  (1731) - SATB, str, bc - 24th Sunday after Trinity
 GWV 1165/32:  (1732) - SATB, fl (2), tra, hn (2), timp (4), str, bc - 24th Sunday after Trinity
 GWV 1165/33:  (1733) - SATB, (fl), str, bc - 24th Sunday after Trinity
 GWV 1165/35:  (1735) - SATB, str, bc - 24th Sunday after Trinity
 GWV 1165/39:  (1739) - SATB, ob, str, bc - 24th Sunday after Trinity
 GWV 1165/41:  (1741) - SATB, str, bc - 24th Sunday after Trinity
 GWV 1165/42:  (1742) - SATB, fg, str, bc - 24th Sunday after Trinity
 GWV 1165/43:  (1743) - SATB, str, bc - 24th Sunday after Trinity
 GWV 1165/45:  (1745) - SATB, str, bc - 24th Sunday after Trinity
 GWV 1165/47:  (1747) - SATB, (hn (2)), str, bc - 24th Sunday after Trinity

GWV 1166

 GWV 1166/12a:  (1712) - SATB, ob (2), clar (2), timp (2), str, bc - 25th Sunday after Trinity
 GWV 1166/12b:  (1712) - B, ob (2), str, bc - 25th Sunday after Trinity
 GWV 1166/20:  (1720) - SB, fl, str, bc - 25th Sunday after Trinity
 GWV 1166/36:  (1736) - SATB, str, bc - 25th Sunday after Trinity
 GWV 1166/38:  (1738) - SATB, vl (2), str, bc - 25th Sunday after Trinity
 GWV 1166/39:  (1739) - SATB, fl/ob, fg, str, bc - 25th Sunday after Trinity
 GWV 1166/41:  (1741) - SATB, ob (2), str, bc - 25th Sunday after Trinity
 GWV 1166/42:  (1742) - SATB, ob (2), hn (2), timp (4), str, bc - 25th Sunday after Trinity
 GWV 1166/50:  (1750) - ATB, hn (2), str, bc - 25th Sunday after Trinity

GWV 1167

 GWV 1167/09a:  (1709) - SATB, str, bc - 26th Sunday after Trinity
 GWV 1167/09b:  (1709) - B, vl unis, bc - 26th Sunday after Trinity
 GWV 1167/20:  (1720) - SSTB, str, bc - 26th Sunday after Trinity
 GWV 1167/23:  (1723) - SATB, fg, str, bc - 26th Sunday after Trinity
 GWV 1167/25:  (1725) - SSATTB, fl, ob (3), fg, clar, str, bc - 26th Sunday after Trinity
 GWV 1167/28:  (1728) - SATB, tra, str, bc - 26th Sunday after Trinity
 GWV 1167/31:  (1731) - SATB, str, bc - 26th Sunday after Trinity
 GWV 1167/39:  (1739) - SATB, ob (2), fg, str, bc - 26th Sunday after Trinity
 GWV 1167/41:  (1741) - SATB, ob, fg, str, bc - 26th Sunday after Trinity
 GWV 1167/42:  (1742) - SATB, str, bc - 26th Sunday after Trinity
 GWV 1167/47:  (1747) - SATB, fl (2), hn (2), timp (4), str, bc - 26th Sunday after Trinity

GWV 1168

 GWV 1168/42:  (1742) - SATB, str, bc - 27th Sunday after Trinity

GWV 1169

 GWV 1169/10:  (1710) - SSATB, fl (2), ob (2), fg (2), str, bc - Candlemas (2.2.)
 GWV 1169/14:  (1714) - STB, ob (2), str, bc - Candlemas (2.2.)
 GWV 1169/19:  (1719) - SSATB, str, bc - Candlemas (2.2.)
 GWV 1169/22:  (1722) - SATB, str, bc - Candlemas (2.2.)
 GWV 1169/25:  (1725) - SATB, str, bc - Candlemas (2.2.)
 GWV 1169/26:  (1726) - SATB, fl (2), ob (2), fg, str, bc - Candlemas (2.2.)
 GWV 1169/28:  (1728) - SAT, str, bc - Candlemas (2.2.)
 GWV 1169/30:  (1730) - SATB, str, bc - Candlemas (2.2.)
 GWV 1169/32:  (1732) - SATB, str, bc - Candlemas (2.2.)
 GWV 1169/33:  (1733) - SATB, str, bc - Candlemas (2.2.)
 GWV 1169/36:  (1736) - SATB, str, bc - Candlemas (2.2.)
 GWV 1169/37:  (1737) - SAT, str, bc - Candlemas (2.2.)
 GWV 1169/40:  (1740) - SATB, chal (3)stb, hn (2), vla (2), str, bc - Candlemas (2.2.)
 GWV 1169/41:  (1741) - SATB, str, bc - Candlemas (2.2.)
 GWV 1169/42:  (1742) - SATB, str, bc - Candlemas (2.2.)
 GWV 1169/43:  (1743) - SATB, str, bc - Candlemas (2.2.)
 GWV 1169/45a:  (1745) - SATB, str, bc - Candlemas (2.2.)
 GWV 1169/45b:  (1745) - SATB, fl (2), hn (2), timp (4), str, bc - Candlemas (2.2.)
 GWV 1169/48:  (1748) - SATB, str, bc - Candlemas (2.2.)
 GWV 1169/49:  (1749) - SATB, chal (2)ab, fg, hn (2), timp (4), str, bc - Candlemas (2.2.)

GWV 1170

 GWV 1170/19:  (1719) - SATB, str, bc - Annunciation of our Lady (25.3.)
 GWV 1170/20:  (1720) - SSSAB, ob, str, bc - Annunciation of our Lady (25.3.)
 GWV 1170/22:  (1722) - SSATB, ob (2), hn (2), str, bc - Annunciation of our Lady (25.3.)
 GWV 1170/30:  (1730) - SATB, fl am, ob am, str, bc - Annunciation of our Lady (25.3.)
 GWV 1170/33:  (1733) - SATB, str, bc - Annunciation of our Lady (25.3.)
 GWV 1170/37:  (1737) - SATB, str, bc - Annunciation of our Lady (25.3.)
 GWV 1170/40:  (1740) - SATB, ob (2), str, bc - Annunciation of our Lady (25.3.)
 GWV 1170/41:  (1741) - SATB, fl (2), ob (2), fg, str, bc - Annunciation of our Lady (25.3.)
 GWV 1170/43:  (1743) - ATB, str, bc - Annunciation of our Lady (25.3.)
 GWV 1170/44:  (1744) - SATB, str, bc - Annunciation of our Lady (25.3.)
 GWV 1170/45:  (1745) - SATB, str, bc - Annunciation of our Lady (25.3.)
 GWV 1170/48:  (1748) - SATB, str, bc - Annunciation of our Lady (25.3.)
 GWV 1170/49:  (1749) - SATB, fl (2), hn (2), str, bc - Annunciation of our Lady (25.3.)

GWV 1171

 GWV 1171/11:  (1711) - S, vl unis, bc - The Visitation of Mary (2.7.)
 GWV 1171/12:  (1712) - SSATB, ob(2), str, bc - The Visitation of Mary (2.7.)
 GWV 1171/16:  (1716) - SSATB, fg (2), str, bc - The Visitation of Mary (2.7.)
 GWV 1171/19:  (1719) - SATB, str, bc - The Visitation of Mary (2.7.)
 GWV 1171/21:  (1721) - ST, str, bc - The Visitation of Mary (2.7.)
 GWV 1171/22:  (1722) - SSATB, ob (2), fg, str, bc - The Visitation of Mary (2.7.)
 GWV 1171/25:  (1725) - SSATB, str, bc - The Visitation of Mary (2.7.)
 GWV 1171/27:  (1727) - ATB, str, bc - The Visitation of Mary (2.7.)
 GWV 1171/31:  (1731) - SATB, str, bc - The Visitation of Mary (2.7.)
 GWV 1171/40:  (1740) - SATB, fl, ob (2), clar (2), timp (3), str, bc - The Visitation of Mary (2.7.)
 GWV 1171/42:  (1742) - SATB, clar, str, bc - The Visitation of Mary (2.7.)
 GWV 1171/43:  (1743) - SATB, str, bc - The Visitation of Mary (2.7.)
 GWV 1171/44:  (1744) - SATB, fl, fg, hn (2), timp (4), str, bc - The Visitation of Mary (2.7.)
 GWV 1171/45:  (1745) - ATB, str, bc - The Visitation of Mary (2.7.)
 GWV 1171/46:  (1746) - ATB, hn (2), timp (4), str, bc - The Visitation of Mary (2.7.)
 GWV 1171/47:  (1747) - SATB, str, bc - The Visitation of Mary (2.7.)
 GWV 1171/48:  (1748) - SATB, fg, hn (2), str, bc - The Visitation of Mary (2.7.)
 GWV 1171/49:  (1749) - SATB, str, bc - The Visitation of Mary (2.7.)

GWV 1172

 GWV 1172/22:  (1722) - SATB, ob (2), clar (2), timp (2), str, bc - Latin Works

GWV 1173

 GWV 1173/17:  (1717) - SSATB, fg (2), clar (2), timp (2), violetta (2), str, bc - Reformation Feast
 GWV 1173/30a:  (1730) - SATB, ob am/fl, clar (2), timp (2), str, bc - Reformation Feast
 GWV 1173/30b:  (1730) - SATB, fl am, ob am, fg, clar (2), timp (2), str, bc - Reformation Feast

GWV 1174

 GWV 1174/09:  (1709) - SATB, ob, clar (2), timp (2), str, bc - Anniversary
 GWV 1174/14:  (1714) - SSSATB, ob (2), clar (2), timp (2), str, bc - Anniversary
 GWV 1174/15:  (1715) - SSATB, ob (2), hn (2), clar (2), timp (2), str, bc - Anniversary
 GWV 1174/16:  (1716) - SSATB, ob (2), fg, clar (2), timp (2), str, bc - Anniversary
 GWV 1174/17:  (1717) - SATB, ob (am), clar (2), timp (2), vla am, str, bc - Anniversary
 GWV 1174/18:  (1718) - SSATB, fl (2), ob (2), clar (2), timp (2), vla am, str, bc - Anniversary
 GWV 1174/19:  (1719) - SSATB, clar (2), timp (2), str, bc - Anniversary
 GWV 1174/20:  (1720) - SSATB, fg (2), clar (2), timp (2), vla am, str, bc - Anniversary
 GWV 1174/21:  (1721) - SSATB, fl (2), ob (2), fg, clar (2), timp (2), str, cont - Anniversary
 GWV 1174/22:  (1722) - SSTB, rec (2), ob (2), clar (2), timp (2), str, bc - Anniversary
 GWV 1174/23:  (1723) - SSATB, fg?, hn (2)?, clar (2), timp (2), str, bc - Anniversary
 GWV 1174/24:  (1724) - SSATB, ob, hn (2), clar (2), timp (2), str, bc - Anniversary
 GWV 1174/25:  (1725) - SATB, fl (2), ob (3), fg, hn (2), clar (2), timp (2), str, bc - Anniversary
 GWV 1174/26:  (1726) - SATB, fl (2), ob (2), fg, clar (2), timp (2), str, bc - Anniversary
 GWV 1174/27:  (1727) - SAT, fl (2), ob (3), fg, clar (2), timp (2), str, bc - Anniversary
 GWV 1174/28:  (1728) - SATB, fl, ob (2), clar (2), timp (2), str, bc - Anniversary
 GWV 1174/29:  (1729) - SATB, fl, fg, clar (2), timp (2), vl, str, bc - Anniversary
 GWV 1174/30:  (1730) - SATB, fl am, ob am, clar (2), timp (2), str, bc - Anniversary
 GWV 1174/31:  (1731) - SATB, fl (2), (ob), clar (2), timp (2), vl (2), str, bc - Anniversary
 GWV 1174/32:  (1732) - SATBBB, fl (2), hn (2), clar (2), timp (4), str, bc - Anniversary
 GWV 1174/33:  (1733) - SATB, (fl), hn (2), clar (2), timp (3), str, bc - Anniversary
 GWV 1174/34:  (1734) - SSATB, fl (2), chal (2)tb, hn (2), clar (2), timp (3), str, bc - Anniversary
 GWV 1174/35:  (1735) - SSATB, chal (2)tb, clar (2), timp (2), str, bc - Anniversary
 GWV 1174/36:  (1736) - SATB, fl (2), chal (2)tb, fg, clar (2), timp (4), str, bc - Anniversary
 GWV 1174/37:  (1737) - SSATB, chal (2)a/tb, fg, clar (2), timp (2), str, bc - Anniversary
 GWV 1174/38:  (1738) - SATB, chal (3)atb, fg, clar (2), timp (4), vl (2), vla am, str, bc - Anniversary
 GWV 1174/40:  (1740) - SATB, ob, chal (3)stb, hn (2), clar (2), timp (3), vl, str, bc - Anniversary
 GWV 1174/41:  (1741) - SATB, ob (2), chal (3)stb, fg, clar (2), timp (2), str, bc - Anniversary
 GWV 1174/42:  (1742) - SATB, rec (2), ob (2), hn (2), clar (2), timp (4), vl (2), str, bc - Anniversary
 GWV 1174/43:  (1743) - SATB, chal (2)tb, hn (2), timp (4), str, bc - Anniversary
 GWV 1174/44:  (1744) - SATB, chal (2)ab, hn (2), timp (4), str, bc - Anniversary
 GWV 1174/45:  (1745) - ATB, ob (2), fg, hn (2), clar (2), timp (4), str, bc - Anniversary
 GWV 1174/46:  (1746) - SATB, chal (2)tb, hn (2), clar (2), timp (4), str, bc - Anniversary
 GWV 1174/47:  (1747) - ATB, (ob), hn (2), clar (2), timp (4), str, bc - Anniversary
 GWV 1174/48:  (1748) - SATB, hn (2), clar (2), timp (4), str, bc - Anniversary
 GWV 1174/49:  (1749) - SATB, hn (2), clar (2), timp (4), str, bc - Anniversary
 GWV 1174/50:  (1750) - SATB, fl (2), ob (2), hn (2), clar (2), timp (4), str, bc - Anniversary
 GWV 1174/51:  (1751) - SATB, fl (2), hn (2), timp (4), str, bc - Anniversary
 GWV 1174/52:  (1752) - SATB, fl (2), hn (2), clar (2), timp (4), str, bc - Anniversary
 GWV 1174/53:  (1753) - SATB, fl (2), fg (2), hn (2), clar (2), timp (4), str, bc - Anniversary
 GWV 1174/54:  (1754) - SATB, fl (2), klar (2), fg (2), hn (2), timp (4), str, bc - Anniversary

GWV 1175

 GWV 1175/16a:  (1716) - SSATB, ob (2), str, bc - Funeral Music
 GWV 1175/16b:  (1716) - SSATB, ob (2), str, bc - Funeral Music
 GWV 1175/26a:  (1726) - SSATB, rec, str, bc - Funeral Music
 GWV 1175/26b:  (1726) - SSATB, fl, ob (2) str, bc - Funeral Music
 GWV 1175/26c:  (1726) - SATB, fl (2), ob (2), vla am, str, bc - Funeral Music
 GWV 1175/31a:  (1731) - SATB, fl, clar (2), timp (2), str, bc - Funeral Music
 GWV 1175/31b:  (1731) - SATB, str, bc - Funeral Music
 GWV 1175/31c:  (1731) - SATB, clar (2), timp (2), str, bc - Funeral Music
 GWV 1175/32:  (1732) - SATB, fl (2), str, bc - Funeral Music
 GWV 1175/39a:  (1739) - SATB, (fl/ob), chal (3)atb, clar (2), timp (2), vl (2), str, bc - Funeral Music
 GWV 1175/39b:  (1739) - SATB, (fl/ob), chal (3)atb, fg, clar (2), timp (2), vla am (2), str, bc - Funeral Music
 GWV 1175/39c:  (1739) - SATB, ob (3), fg, hn (2), clar, timp (2), str, bc - Funeral Music
 GWV 1175/46:  (1746) - SATB, str, bc - Funeral Music

GWV 1176
 GWV 1176/38:  (1738) - SATBB, chal (2)ab, fg, hn (2), clar (2), timp (4), str, bc - Incidental Music

See also
 List of symphonies by Christoph Graupner
 List of harpsichord pieces by Christoph Graupner
 List of orchestral suites by Christoph Graupner
 List of concertos by Christoph Graupner
 List of chamber pieces by Christoph Graupner

References

External links
Graupner GWV-online a digital Graupner Werkverzeichnis with integrated search function
The Christoph Graupner Society Homepage
Extensive online bibliography for research on Christoph Graupner
Geneviève Soly - Love at First Note! by Réjean Beaucage (in English and French)
ULB Library  Graupner's music manuscripts and archives in Darmstadt, Germany
Kim Patrick Clow's webpage dedicated to promoting Graupner's work.

 Christoph Graupner's works at La Sinfonie d'Orphée

Cantatas
Graupner, Christoph